= Muhammad bin Abdullah al-Khalili =

Imam of the Ibadi imamate in interior Oman (1920–1954)

- محمد بن عبد الله بن سعيد الخليلي

Imam of Oman (interior)
- In office July 1920 – May 1954
- Preceded by: Salim bin Rashid al-Kharusi
- Succeeded by: Ghalib bin Ali al-Hinai

Personal details
- Born: 1881
- Died: May 1954 (aged 72–73)
- Relatives: Ali bin Abdullah al-Khalili (brother)

Muhammad bin Abdullah al-Khalili (Arabic: محمد بن عبد الله بن سعيد الخليلي; 1881 – May 1954) was an Ibadi scholar and tribal leader who served as the Imam of the interior of Oman from 1920 until his death. He was elected after the assassination of his predecessor, Salim bin Rashid al-Kharusi, at a moment when the imamate revived in 1913 was losing ground to the Sultanate of Muscat and Oman.

Two months after his election the imamate concluded the Treaty of Seeb (the Agreement of al-Sib) with Sultan Taimur bin Feisal, mediated by the British political agent at Muscat. The agreement ended the war between the coast and the interior and left the tribes of the interior to govern themselves under the Imam in return for peace and the payment of customary dues at the coastal ports; the question of sovereignty was, in the words of the British mediator, "never mentioned". The settlement held for the whole of al-Khalili's imamate. Its meaning was disputed afterwards, and it figured in the Jebel Akhdar rebellion of 1957–59 and in the diplomatic dispute known as the "Question of Oman".

Al-Khalili died in early May 1954 and was succeeded by Ghalib bin Ali al-Hinai, a compromise candidate whose imamate coincided with the arrival of oil prospectors in the interior.

== Background ==
=== Family ===
Al-Khalili was born in 1299 AH (1881 CE), according to Said al-Hashimy's doctoral study of the imamate revival, the only source found that gives his birth year. He belonged to the Al Khalili, a family of scholars and tribal leaders of Wadi Samail. Although the Khalili clan was part of the Bani Kharus tribe, the Bani Ruwaha of Wadi Samail had invited its shaykhs to lead them.

His grandfather, Said bin Khalfan al-Khalili, was a leading scholar who played a prominent part in the election of Imam Azzan bin Qais in 1868. His father, Abdullah bin Said al-Khalili (1861–1914), was the leader (tamimah) of the Bani Ruwaha and held great standing among the Hinawi tribes of Wadi Samail. According to al-Hashimy he opposed the revival of the imamate, partly because he feared losing his position and partly because the revival was backed by Himyar bin Nasir al-Nabhani, his enemy; he chose to live under the Sultan's protection and died in an accident in Wadi al-Hawasinah in Jumada II 1332 AH (1914).

Al-Khalili's brother Ali bin Abdullah al-Khalili later served Sultan Said bin Taimur as governor (wali) of Bausher until Ali's death in 1949.

=== The imamate of 1913 and al-Khalili's exclusion ===
In 1913 a group of Ibadi scholars and tribal leaders, driven by Abdullah bin Humaid al-Salimi, revived the imamate and elected Salim bin Rashid al-Kharusi. According to al-Hashimy, at the meeting held on 12 Jumada II 1331 AH, al-Salimi proposed that the choice be limited to four men, of whom the 32-year-old Muhammad al-Khalili was the first. He did not attend the meeting, and the assembly decided not to put him forward because of his father's hostility to the imamate. The family's fort at Samail was nonetheless drawn into the fighting: in the summer of 1913 Abdullah bin Said left the fort to his son Ali when he went to Muscat, and after a week the fort was handed over to the forces of the Imam.

In 1914 an attempt by the Sultan to arrange a reconciliation with the Samail shaykhs failed, allegedly because Muhammad bin Abdullah al-Khalili claimed that surrendering the fort would be a disgrace, since it had been entrusted to his tribe as a neutral guardian; Peterson considers the more convincing explanation to be that the Sultan's overture was read as a sign of weakness. By 1920 al-Khalili was counted among the leading scholars of the imamate; al-Hashimy calls him "one of the most prominent ulama" who combined mastery of learning with the art of politics.

== Election as Imam ==
=== The crisis of 1920 ===
By the summer of 1920 the imamate of Salim al-Kharusi was in difficulty. The death in April 1920 of the powerful Ghafiri shaykh Himyar bin Nasir al-Nabhani had weakened the Omani leadership; the Sultan had raised the duty on produce from the interior to 25 per cent on dates and 50 per cent on pomegranates in an attempt to force the Imam's hand; and the Imam's calls for help against the ruler of al-Hazm had been ignored by the shaykhs. Peterson reports that al-Khalili had advised the Omanis to buy the disputed date gardens from the Imam and give them to the Sultan, since otherwise the zakat would cost some three lakhs of rupees.

On the night of Wednesday 5 Dhu al-Qi'dah 1338 AH (21 July 1920), while travelling to al-Mudhaybi to settle a dispute with the Al Wahibah, Imam Salim was shot dead in his sleep by a tribesman of the Al Wahibah, Abu Bisrah, at al-Khadra' in Wadi Bani Difa'. (Note: Peterson gives the date of the murder as 23 July 1920 and the place as Wadi Andam.)

=== The election ===
According to al-Hashimy, a week after the assassination the scholars and tribal leaders met and elected "the learned man" Muhammad bin Abdullah al-Khalili, leader of the Bani Ruwaha. Peterson adds that the election was dominated by Isa bin Salih al-Harthi, the most influential shaykh of the Hinawi tribes, whose choice (allegedly his father-in-law) was elected; al-Khalili was presented to the notables at Nizwa, who readily gave him their bay'ah (pledge of allegiance). Those who gave the pledge included the chief judge Amir bin Khamis al-Maliki, Majid bin Khamis al-Ibri, Abdullah bin Muhammad bin Ruzayq al-Riyami, Isa bin Salih al-Harthi, Muhammad bin Salim al-Ruqayshi and Sayf bin Ali al-Maskari. Sulayman bin Himyar withheld his allegiance for a time and sent a representative instead.

The new Imam's first tasks were the security of the Rustaq district and the punishment of Salim's killer. He dismissed Salim's brother Nasir bin Rashid al-Kharusi as governor of Rustaq, because the tribes were dissatisfied with his conduct, and appointed Sayyid Hilal bin Ali Al Bu Said in his place. He condemned the murderer to death, imprisoned the shaykhs of the Al Wahibah to force them to hand him over and, when that failed, announced a large reward; a year after the murder a man of the Janabah tribe, Maktum bin Hamush al-Junaybi, killed Abu Bisrah near Ibri.

== Treaty of Seeb (1920) ==
=== Negotiation ===
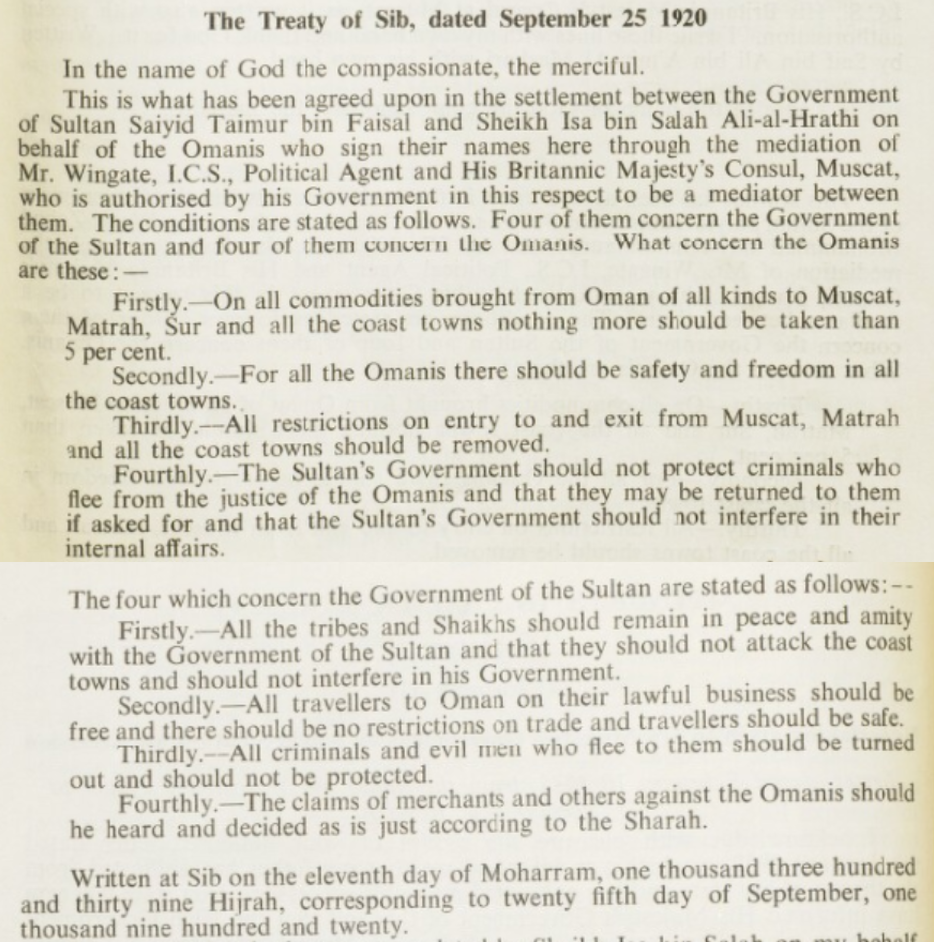
Text of the Treaty of Seeb, 25 September 1920

Negotiations between the Sultan and the Omani leaders, which Salim's imamate had blocked, were reopened at al-Sib, a coastal town about 35 miles from Muscat, on 23 September 1920 and concluded on the 26th. Ronald Wingate, the British political agent and consul at Muscat, mediated and signed on behalf of the Sultan; Isa bin Salih al-Harthi was the principal Omani negotiator. Wingate later recalled that the shaykhs insisted that the agreement be made between the Sultan and "the Imam of the Muslims" (Imam al-Muslimin); he refused, because the Sultan would then have acknowledged another ruler. A way out was found by recalling the Prophet's treaty at Hudaybiyyah, and the word Imam was omitted from the body of the document, which recorded conditions arranged between the Sultan's government and Isa bin Salih "as representing the Omani tribes".

The text was discussed, written and signed solely in Arabic; the English versions are translations "for information". Wingate's translation is in the British files, and the Arabic text is printed in al-Salimi's Nahdat al-A'yan.

=== Terms ===
The agreement took the form of two identical letters addressed to Wingate by the Sultan's government and by the Omani tribes, each accepting and guaranteeing the terms. In Wingate's translation the body of the text contains four clauses concerning the Omanis and four concerning the Sultan's government:

Clauses concerning the Omanis		Clauses concerning the Sultan's government	
1	No more than 5 per cent to be levied on goods brought from Oman to Muscat, Matrah, Sur and all the coastal towns.	1	All tribes and shaykhs to remain at peace with the Sultan's government, not to attack the coastal towns and not to interfere in his government.
2	Safety and freedom for all Omanis in the coastal towns.	2	Lawful travellers to Oman to be free, and trade unrestricted and safe.
3	All restrictions on entry to and exit from Muscat, Matrah and the coastal towns to be removed.	3	Criminals and evil-doers who flee to the interior to be expelled and not protected.
4	The Sultan's government not to protect criminals fleeing Omani justice, to return them if asked, and not to interfere in the Omanis' internal affairs.	4	Claims of merchants and others against Omanis to be heard and decided justly according to the shari'a.

The Omanis' letter is dated at al-Sib on 11 Muharram 1339 AH (25 September 1920). The Sultan's letter, signed by the acting wazir, Sayyid Muhammad bin Ahmad, and sealed with the Sultan's seal, is dated at Muscat on 14 Muharram (28 September). The date gardens at Samail, the original obstacle, were returned in exchange for the release of four prisoners held in Muscat.

=== The Imam's role ===
Wingate telegraphed that "there is no mention of recognition of Sultan or Imam" in the agreement. The Imam's own part was that of guarantor. The Omanis' letter bears the words "I have completed what was completed by Sheikh Isa bin Salah on my behalf in these conditions. Written by Imam-al-Muslamin Mohammad bin Abdullah with his own hand", and Isa bin Salih signed "on behalf of the Imam-al-Muslamin Mohammad bin Abdullah-al-Khalili"; fourteen other shaykhs added their signatures. The Imam's guarantee was obtained on 28 September, and the other shaykhs signed by early October.

=== Interpretation ===
The legal effect of the agreement was disputed from the outset. Wingate's own view was that it "recognized the facts of the situation" and granted the tribal leaders "the right of self-government, or non-interference by the Sultan in their internal affairs" in return for peace and the customary dues at the ports; he wrote that the peace "lasted for thirty-five years". Peterson noted that the clauses binding the Sultan (one to three) and those binding the Omanis (one, two and four) amount to a return to the conditions that preceded the hostilities of 1913, and that the only new element was the exchange of fugitives from justice, which he considered a poor foundation for the claim that a separate government existed in the interior. Advocates of the imamate, notably the Arab Information Centre, argued that the agreement created an independent "Imamate of Oman" distinct from the "Sultanate of Muscat"; J. B. Kelly rebutted that reading. British ministers took the Sultan's side: in June 1959 the Under-Secretary of State for Foreign Affairs, David Ormsby-Gore, told the House of Commons that nothing in the agreement derogated from the Sultan's sovereignty over the interior.

== Rule ==
=== Capital and administration ===
Al-Khalili governed from Nizwa, the political and scholarly centre of the interior. The administration consisted of governors (wali) and judges (qadi) appointed by the Imam in the main towns. The scholar Mansur al-Farisi was appointed chief judge in Nizwa in 1361 AH (1942) and became a close adviser; he resigned from supervising the bayt al-mal (treasury) in 1367 AH (1948), and criticised the Imam for deciding on a letter from Turki bin Utaishan without consulting Omani notables. Other appointments included Khalfan bin Jumayl as judge of Samail in 1362 AH. Muhammad bin Salim al-Ruqayshi, who had served Imam Salim, was moved by al-Khalili to Nakhl and in 1360 AH (1941) to Ibri.

Revenue came chiefly from zakat. Al-Hashimy records that the Imam sold all his properties at Samail for the sake of the bayt al-mal and to meet part of the government's expenditure. The bayt al-mal also funded the school established in the imamate's capital.

=== Relations with the Sultanate ===
Sultan Said bin Taimur, who succeeded in 1932, courted the tribal leaders and used governorships to bind them; he made the Imam's own brother Ali his governor of Bausher. The British Residency's summary of events for 1928–53 records that the Sultan treated the Treaty of Seeb as a private arrangement, that Britain did not formally renew it in 1932 and kept out of the interior, and that the Imam never formally accepted or rejected Said's sovereignty. In 1952–53 the Imam issued passports in his own name before stopping; in March 1953 Salih bin Isa said that the Imam controlled internal affairs and the Sultan external affairs, while Sulayman bin Himyar claimed full independence.

When Saudi forces occupied the Buraimi oasis in 1952, the Imam promised to support Said in recovering it and sent his tribal followers; a force gathered at Sohar, but the campaign was held back when the British consul advised Said to delay in favour of diplomacy.

=== Oil ===
The oil concession signed in June 1937 covered Dhofar only. The Iraq Petroleum Company wanted access to the interior, then under the Imam, and British officials noted that his authority seemed to be weakening; Said argued that his father's oil undertaking of 1923 did not bind him. By 1954, oil-company interests, the Sultan's aspirations and the politics of the interior were converging on the same ground.

== Death and succession ==
Al-Khalili died in early May 1954. Al-Hashimy dates his death to 1374 AH on one page and 1373 AH on another; May 1954 falls within 1373 AH, which began in September 1953. He was succeeded by Ghalib bin Ali al-Hinai, then aged 35, whom Allen and Rigsbee describe as a compromise candidate acceptable to the tribal leaders because he was the nominee of neither of the two most powerful chiefs, Sulayman bin Himyar and Salih bin Isa. Ghalib's brother Talib, the governor of Rustaq, established ties with the Saudis, which deepened distrust among the tribal leaders. In September 1954 the oil company's armed force occupied Ibri, a town in which the new Imam had appointed a governor.

== Assessment ==
Wingate, the British negotiator of the treaty, wrote that the peace it brought lasted for thirty-five years, during which "the tribes of interior Oman were entirely self-governing, under the Imam, as leader of the confederation". Allen and Rigsbee, describing the reign of Sultan Taimur, characterise it by "humiliating defeats at the hands of the resurgent tribes of the interior" under the imamates of Salim al-Kharusi and al-Khalili and by the Treaty of Sib, "recognizing tribal autonomy in interior Oman". Uzi Rabi has called al-Khalili's imamate of 1920–54 "the last chapter of a lost and forgotten legacy" of Ibadi rule.

== See also ==
- Imamate of Oman
- Treaty of Seeb
- Jebel Akhdar War
- Said bin Taimur
