= Salim bin Rashid al-Kharusi =

Imam of Oman (1913–1920)

- سالم بن راشد الخروصي

Imam of Oman (interior)
- In office May 1913 – July 1920
- Succeeded by: Muhammad bin Abdullah al-Khalili

Personal details
- Born: c. 1883 Masha'iq, near al-Suwayq, Oman
- Died: July 1920 Wadi Bani Difa' (or Wadi Andam), Oman
- Spouse(s): Zayanah bint Abdullah al-Salimi; Azzah bint Nasir al-Ma'wali; Raya bint Muhammad al-Kharusi
- Children: Yahya, Abdullah, Ya'qub

Salim bin Rashid al-Kharusi (Arabic: سالم بن راشد الخروصي; c. 1883 – July 1920) was an Ibadi scholar who in 1913 was elected Imam of the interior of Oman, reviving an office that had been in abeyance since the nineteenth century. Chosen by an assembly led by his teacher and father-in-law, the blind theologian Abdullah bin Humaid al-Salimi, he led the tribes of the interior in a seven-year struggle against the Sultanate of Muscat and Oman, whose forces were sustained by Indian Army troops sent by the British. He was assassinated in July 1920 and was succeeded by Muhammad bin Abdullah al-Khalili, whose imamate concluded the Treaty of Seeb with the Sultan.

== Early life ==
=== Family ===
Salim was born in 1301 AH (1883–84) in the village of Masha'iq, attached to al-Suwayq, in a family of four sons and one daughter. His full lineage, as given by Said al-Hashimy, is Salim bin Rashid bin Sulayman bin Amir bin Abdullah bin Mas'ud and so on back to Imam Azzan bin Tamim al-Kharusi, the last imam of the second Ibadi imamate; al-Hashimy notes that some interviewees denied that the name Abdullah belongs to the pedigree, but concludes from the testimony of Salim's brother and son that it does. The Bani Kharus are one of the best-known tribes of Oman, of Ghafiri political orientation and Ibadi faith, and they had provided imams and scholars from medieval times.

Salim's brothers were Nasir, Muhammad and Amir, and his sister Miya; all survived him. His father, Rashid, died a few years before 1913, and his mother, Salimah bint Rashid al-Kharusi, in the 1920s. He married three times: first Zayanah, daughter of Abdullah bin Humaid al-Salimi (died c. 1916), who bore him two sons, Yahya (born 1913) and Abdullah (born 1916); then Azzah bint Nasir al-Ma'wali, who bore Ya'qub; and finally Raya bint Muhammad bin Yahya al-Kharusi.

=== Education ===
Salim learned reading and writing from the village teachers, probably including his father. In his teens he was sent with his brother Nasir to a school in al-Awabi, and then to Rustaq, where he studied under Rashid bin Sayf al-Lamki (1845–1914). About 1901, at the age of eighteen, he left for al-Sharqiyyah to complete his studies with Abdullah bin Humaid al-Salimi in the town of al-Qabil, where he stayed for more than twelve years until his election, visiting his parents only in summer; al-Hashimy records that Muhammad al-Salimi doubts this chronology and suggests Salim may have moved when he was younger. He refused any post, although his tribe wanted him as a teacher in Nakhl or al-Awabi, and al-Salimi later gave him his daughter in marriage. He was supported by a bursary from the school funds derived from zakat, gifts and endowments, and by the food his teachers and fellow scholars sent him; al-Hashimy states that he lived mainly on dates and water.

Al-Hashimy stresses that Salim was not a tribal leader before his election. Major Chauncy, the British political agent in Muscat, claimed in 1951 that Salim's son Yahya was a chief of the Bani Kharus; al-Hashimy rejects this as unsubstantiated, noting that no one from the Bani Kharus attended the assembly at which Salim was chosen, and that Salim never claimed leadership of his clan.

== Revival of the imamate ==
=== Background ===
The imamate had been largely in abeyance since the Al Bu Said rulers dropped the title early in the nineteenth century. Peterson identifies several causes of its revival in 1913: a swelling of religious feeling led by the blind theologian Abdullah bin Humaid al-Salimi; economic decline and the inability of Sultan Faisal bin Turki to continue paying stipends to the main shaykhs; indignation at British influence over the Sultan, who had banned the slave trade and in 1912 established an arms warehouse at Muscat; and the ambitions of the two principal shaykhs of the interior, Himyar bin Nasir al-Nabhani of the Ghafiri faction and Isa bin Salih al-Harthi of the Hinawi faction. Al-Hashimy argues against the view that the revival was merely a coalition of tribal parties, holding that it rested on Islamic law.

=== The assembly at Tanuf ===
Himyar called an assembly of notables at his headquarters at Tanuf near Nizwa in May 1913; Isa bin Salih was not present and the Hinawi participation came only after the capture of Izki a month later. According to al-Hashimy the scholars and leaders discussed the establishment of an imamate for three days in Jumada II 1331 AH, divided between supporters and opponents; the sceptics pointed out that the Sultan's forces surrounded them, that most Hinawi tribes were absent, and that al-Salimi was a poor man without followers. On the afternoon of 12 Jumada II (about 19 May 1913), al-Salimi asked the assembly to choose one of four men: Muhammad bin Abdullah al-Khalili, Sayyid Hilal bin Ali Al Bu Said, Abu Zayd Abdullah bin Muhammad al-Riyami, and Salim bin Rashid al-Kharusi. Al-Khalili and Hilal were absent.

=== Election ===
Al-Hashimy, following the eyewitness account of Muhammad al-Salimi, describes how Salim at first refused the nomination, telling the scholars: "I did not come here to be elected, but to elect whomever you want to elect." He was carried before the blind Abdullah al-Salimi, who warned that refusal would split the community and issued a fatwa that he should be put to death, whereupon Salim, in tears, submitted. He asked only that he be allowed to perform the pilgrimage and to visit his mother in his village. Before sunset on 12 Jumada II 1331 he was elected. The chief judge Amir bin Khamis al-Maliki was the first to pledge after al-Salimi, placing the turban on his head and the signet ring on his finger; the bay'ah recorded that the Imam should obey God and the Prophet, wage jihad, apply the hudud, collect taxes, lead the Friday prayer, and "pursue no course of action without consulting the ulama". The pledgers included Himyar bin Nasir al-Nabhani, six sons and grandsons of Hilal bin Zahir al-Hinai, Abdullah bin Rashid al-Hashimi and Muhammad bin Salim al-Ruqayshi; ordinary people gave their pledge the following day.

Peterson attributes his selection to a combination of personal character and religiosity, his lineage from a line of medieval imams, his relationship as son-in-law to al-Salimi, and the close relationship between the Bani Kharus and the Bani Riyam, the tribe of Himyar.

== Reign ==
=== Campaign of 1913 ===
An army raised mainly from the Bani Riyam and Bani Hina took Nizwa, whose governor, Sayyid Sayf bin Hamad Al Bu Said, killed himself in the mosque where he had barricaded himself, on 5 June 1913; the shaykhs of the Ibriyyin, Janabah, Duru', Hajariyyin and Ya'qub then pledged their allegiance. Izki surrendered on 20 June; Isa bin Salih arrived on 25 June and gradually took over the leadership of the movement; al-Awabi, Salim's family home, fell on 24 June; and the garrison of Samail, commanded by Sultan Faisal's son Nadir, was besieged until a mine exploded in the fort and Nadir withdrew. Bidbid fell on 31 July and Nakhl on 4 August. On 6 July the Sultan appealed to the British, who landed 256 Rajputs at Muscat on 9 July but declined to intervene in the interior. Sultan Faisal died on 4 October 1913 and was succeeded by his son Taimur.

=== Attack on Muscat (1915) ===
Al-Salimi died at the end of January 1914. In January 1915 the Imam's forces, led by Isa bin Salih, advanced from Bidbid on the Muscat suburb of Ruwi but were defeated at Bait al-Falaj by about 750 Indian Army troops; Isa was wounded and his brother killed. British casualties were seven killed and fifteen wounded, against 186 Arabs killed.

=== Peace initiatives ===
The Imam rejected a series of attempts at a settlement: a mediation by Hamdan bin Zayid, the ruler of Abu Dhabi, in November (dated 1913 by al-Hashimy and 1914 by Peterson), which led to a meeting at al-Sib with Isa bin Salih and his brother Ali; a mission of Sultan bin Muhammad al-Na'imi of Buraimi in early 1915; the British initiative of September 1915, in which Political Agent Benn presented the Sultan's terms at al-Sib; and a further British approach in September 1919. The Imam's own conditions in 1915 included full application of the shari'a, the removal of British troops and of the blockade on imports into the interior, the prohibition of wine and tobacco, and free purchase of arms. In 1915 the Imam's qadi Abdullah bin Rashid al-Hashimi was obstinately opposed to surrendering the Samail forts.

=== Consolidation in the interior ===
In June 1916 the Imam's forces captured Bahla from Nasir bin Hamid al-Ghafiri, and in August 1917 his brother Nasir bin Rashid took Rustaq from the Sultan's governor, leaving Nasir entrenched at Rustaq and Sayyid Ahmad bin Ibrahim at al-Hazm for years of open warfare. By that time Indian troops had been stationed at Bait al-Falaj for more than four years; a British report of 1918 stated that Isa bin Salih had withdrawn from the Imam and consistently refused to help him against Rustaq.

=== Government ===
Al-Hashimy describes a traditional Islamic system of government with the Imam at its head, responsible for leading the Friday prayer, organising the army and appointing officials, aided by a nominal consultative council of scholars and leaders. The treasury (bayt al-mal) suffered chronic deficits; the Imam adopted austerity, borrowed from merchants. Among his principal officials were Amir bin Khamis al-Maliki, chief of the judges after 1914; Abu Zayd al-Riyami, wali and judge of Bahla from 1916; and his brother Nasir, governor of the western Hajar province.

== Decline and assassination ==
By 1920 the Imam's position was deteriorating. Himyar bin Nasir al-Nabhani, who according to Wingate was "the strength" of the Omani party, died in April 1920; the Sultan, urged by the British political agent Ronald Wingate, raised the duty on dates exported from the interior from 5 to 25 per cent and on pomegranates to 50 per cent; and the shaykhs refused the Imam's calls for help against Sayyid Ahmad bin Ibrahim of al-Hazm. Wingate wrote that "the Imam was the figurehead, Isa the brains and Hamyar the strength of the Omani party".

On the night of Wednesday 5 Dhu al-Qi'dah 1338 (21 July 1920), on his way to al-Mudhaybi to settle a dispute with the Al Wahibah, the Imam camped near al-Khadra' in Wadi Bani Difa'. A man of the Al Wahibah, Abu Bisrah, who had joined the party that evening, shot him in his sleep. The bullet hit the Imam in the mouth. Al-Hashimy concludes that the assassin acted at the instigation of malefactors from his own tribe, and that the true motive died with him: Abu Bisrah was killed a year later. (Note: Peterson gives the date as 23 July 1920 and the place as Wadi Andam.) A week later the scholars elected Muhammad al-Khalili in his place, and within two months a settlement was signed at al-Sib.

== Legacy ==
Peterson describes the settlement that followed as ending seven years of strife and leaving the interior autonomous under the imamate until the Sultan's forces took physical control of it in December 1955. Al-Hashimy, whose doctoral thesis is the main study of Salim's imamate, argues that the revival was founded on religious law, that Salim was not the head of any political party, and that earlier writers had misnamed him as "Rashid al-Kharusi". A separate treatment of his personality describes a man of medium height and thin build, pious and eloquent, who was often found in the mosque and had "no detractors".

== See also ==
- Imamate of Oman
- Muhammad bin Abdullah al-Khalili
- Treaty of Seeb
