= Ghalib bin Ali =

Ghalib bin Ali bin Hilal al-Hinai
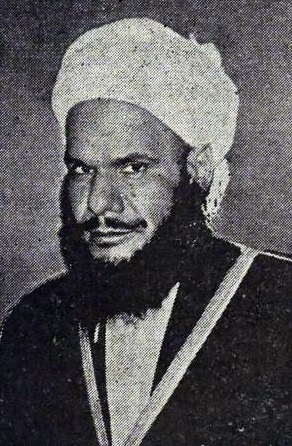
- al-Hinai in 1962

Imam of the Imamate of Oman
- Reign: 3 May 1954 – 30 January 1959
- Predecessor: Muhammad bin Abdullah al-Khalili
- Successor: Imamate abolished
- Born: 1908–1912; Muscat and Oman
- Died: 29 November 2009 (aged 96–101); Dammam, Saudi Arabia

Ghalib bin Ali bin Hilal al-Hinai (Arabic: غالب بن علي الهنائي; c. 1912 – 29 November 2009) was the last elected imam of the Imamate of Oman.

== Early life and career ==
Prior to assuming the role of imam, Ghalib served as the qadi (judge) of Rustaq and Nizwa. He later served as the treasurer of the imamate. After the predecessor, Imam Alkhalili, died on 3 May 1954, Ghalib al-Hinai was elected to be the imam (ruler). His father, Ali bin Hilal al-Hinai, previously served as the wali (governor) of Rustaq. His brother Talib bin Ali would become an effective and determined leader in the imamate's revolt against the sultan of Muscat in the 1950s.

== History ==
Oman was split between the interior, which was known as the Imamate of Oman, and the coastal Oman, known as the Sultanate of Muscat. The British government exercised vast control over the Sultanate as the defence secretary and chief of intelligence, chief adviser to the sultan and all ministers except for two were British. Shortly after Imam Ghalib was elected in 1954, he led the Imamate of Oman in the Jebel Akhdar War against Sultan Said bin Taimur, backed by the British government.

In 1937, an agreement between the sultan and a subsidiary of Iraq Petroleum Company (IPC), a consortium of oil companies that is largely British owned, was signed to grant oil concessions to IPC, in which the sultan received a sizable signature bonus. IPC informed the sultan that potential oil may exist in the interior of Oman and offered financial support to raise an armed force against any potential resistance by the Imamate. The British government favoured IPC's plan as it sought benefits from the expansion of the Sultanate's territory and considered oil discovery in Oman as a valuable insurance against the insecurity of other parts of the Middle East. The planning of occupying and creating further tension within the interior started early in 1945 as news broke out that Imam Alkhalili, the predecessor to Imam al-Hinai, was ill and the sultan expressed his interest to the British government of occupying the interior right after the death of the Imam.

The idea of having the oil company negotiate directly with the interior of Oman was not favored by the British political agent who resided in Muscat providing the justification that it would mean recognizing the authority of the Imamate and it would increase its prestige- which would not favor IPC deal. The British Political Agent believed that the only method of granting the oil company access to the interior was by assisting the sultan in occupying the Imamate. The position of the British government was thereafter to eliminate any possibility of entering into direct relations with the interior in order not to alienate the sultan and to avoid invalidating the claim of IPC that its concession from the sultan covers the entirety of Oman. In 1946, the British government provided arms and ammunition, auxiliary supplies and officers to occupy the interior. In September 1946, the British government studied the proposal that was promised to the sultan of using the British Royal Air Force (RAF) to occupy the interior. The British government concluded that it is reluctant "in principle" to the use of force for the reason of avoiding international criticism that may lead to the calling of the British government before the United Nations Security Council but they executed anyway waging war for over 5 years between the two Head of Estate on the battle ground Jabel Akhdar (The Green Mountain) with over 2,000 martyrs losing their lives. Meanwhile, the British government recognized that the use of RAF would expedite oil exploration operations in the interior of Oman.

The war was triggered by the sultan, Said Bin Taimur, on 25 October 1954, when he licensed IPC oil prospectors to search for oil near Fahud, an area located within the territory of the Imamate of Oman and sent Muscat and Oman Field Force (MOFF), later renamed Sultan of Oman's Armed Forces (SAF), troops to occupy it. The MOFF moved to occupy Tanam on the following day. The move was considered by the Imam to be a breach to the Treaty of Seeb, an agreement which recognized the autonomy of the Imamate. The occupation of Fahud and Tanam was only a prelude to a grand design by the sultanate to occupy the entire imamate. On 13 December 1954, the MOFF, which was instilled with eight British officers, marched from Fahud to Adam and occupied it. Subsequently, the capital of the imamate, Nizwa, was captured by the sultanate on 15 December 1955. However, resistance from the imamate forces persisted and Talib al-Hinai, who was the wali (governor) of Rustaq and the younger brother of the imam, played a key role in strengthening the imamate's forces by recruiting additional forces and acquiring Saudi, Egypt and Iraq's support. The restrengthening of the imamate's forces materialized when a number of the interior villages were recaptured, including Bilad Sayt, on 14 June 1957. The MOFF moved an artillery battery to Bilad Sayt in anticipation of an easy victory. However, the imamate's forces proved to be much better organized than anticipated. After weeks of skirmishes, the MOFF, with no civilian support from the locals in the interior, had no choice but to surrender their way back to Fahud. The Imamate's forces freed Nizwa (capital), Firq, Izki, Tanuf, Bahla and Jebal Akhdar from the sultunate's control, while Ibri was the only area that remained under the occupation of the sultunate.

On 25 July 1958, as a result of the ongoing war and British government's aim to be "less visible" in the Middle East in the post-Suez world, letters were exchanged between the sultan and the British leaders and subsequently an assistance in economic development agreement was signed, which consisted of strengthening the sultan of Oman's armed forces (SAF) by attaching British officers to lead small units and to head the SAF as a whole. The war lasted 5 years until the SAF, with much difficulty and following direct support of soldiers from the British Special Air Service, 1st Battalion of the Cameronions, a troop of the 15/19 Hussars, RAF fighter jets and a squadron of Ferret armoured cars, put down the Jebel Akhdar War in 1959, and Imam Ghalib al-Hinai managed to escape to Saudi Arabia. He continued for a short time to lead a temporary government-in-exile from Dammam (Saudi Arabia) and established an imamate office in Cairo (Egypt) while the fighting continued in Oman.

Imam Ghalib delegated his brother, Talib al-Hinai, who was the wali (governor) of Rustaq, and Suleiman bin Hamyar, who was the wali (governor) of Jebel Akhdar, to present the issue to the Arab League and the United Nations in order to seek recognition and claim legitimacy of the imamate of Oman. The imamate's cause was closely identified with Arab nationalism and the various forms of anti-colonialism that were taking place during that period. In August 1959, the UN Security Council voted by a narrow margin not to consider a request for an urgent meeting to discuss 'British aggression against' an independent imamate of Oman. The UN General Assembly adopted the 'Question of Oman' resolution in 1965, 1966 and again in 1967 that called upon the British government to cease all actions against the locals, end British control over Oman and reaffirmed the inalienable right of the Omani people to self-determination and independence. The 'question of Oman' remained on the UN General Assembly agenda in each year until 1971. The Imamate's cause continued to be promoted up until 1970.

== Election as Imam ==
The imam Muhammad bin Abdullah al-Khalili died in early May 1954. He was succeeded by Ghalib, described by Allen and Rigsbee as a 35-year-old compromise candidate acceptable to all of the tribal leaders because he was not the candidate of either of the two most powerful tamimahs, Sulayman bin Himyar al-Nabhani (son of Himyar bin Nasir al-Nabhani) and Salih bin Isa al-Harthi. (Note: Allen and Rigsbee's age of 35 implies a birth around 1919, whereas the infobox above, following other sources, gives 1908–1912.) His brother Talib, the wali of Rustaq, made the new imam's position harder by establishing ties with the Saudis, which raised the level of distrust among the tribal leaders, especially Sulayman. Through the summer of 1954 Ghalib and Talib tried to consolidate their position while the tamimahs tried to hold on to theirs.

== The dispute over Ibri (1954) ==
Oil-company interests, the Sultan's ambitions and interior politics met in the territory of the Duru' tribe around Fahud. The Imam, asserting his authority, appointed Ibrahim bin Said al-Ibri, formerly chief qadi of Muscat under the Sultan, as his governor at Ibri; the Sultan, Said bin Taimur, protested that Ibri belonged to the sultanate because the Duru' recognised his authority. In September a force of the Muscat and Oman Field Force under Percy Coriat set out with the Duru' shaykhs on what Omani officials took to be a reconnaissance but which its commanders had planned as the occupation of Fahud; the Imam threatened to destroy Duru' property in Ibri, and talks followed between the oil company, the Sultan's officials and Sayyid Ahmad bin Ibrahim. The force advanced to Tan'am, where Ibrahim bin Said promised to hand Ibri over in return for safe conduct, and Coriat occupied the town. Neither the Sultan nor the British were pleased, since the action had disrupted the 34-year-old Treaty of Seeb. Despite this, neither the Imam nor his tribal allies took action, and the Sultan had almost a year of quiet.

== Occupation of the interior (1955) ==
The operation that Neil Innes called the "Grand Design", the occupation of the interior, began on 13 December 1955 with 340 men and eight British officers of the Muscat and Oman Field Force and a group of tribal leaders. They marched from Fahud to Adam and reached Firq the next day with a single shot fired at them; on 15 December word came that the Imam had fled, and Nizwa fell without incident. Ahmad bin Muhammad al-Harithi deposed his uncle Salih bin Isa and brought his men to Nizwa on 16 December, and was made wali there; Salih bin Isa escaped, as did the Imam. In the west the Batinah forces met strong resistance in Wadi Far' near Rustaq on 13 December, and Rustaq was occupied only on 17 December; Talib also escaped.

The Imam was soon found at Ghafat, where Shaykh Zahir bin Ghusn al-Hinai, a strong supporter of the imamate but not of Ghalib, held him under house arrest. Salih bin Isa and Talib reached Saudi Arabia, and Sulayman bin Himyar came into Nizwa on 16 December to offer his allegiance to the Sultan, after which officials ordered him to remain at his headquarters at Tanuf. The Sultan reached Nizwa from Salalah on 24 December.

== Revolt of 1957 ==
For some eighteen months the interior was calm. Sulayman bin Himyar lived under house arrest in Muscat while the Imam stayed as the guest of Zahir bin Ghusn at Ghafat. Talib recruited Omani labourers in Saudi Arabia, who received basic military training, and Ibrahim bin Isa al-Harithi, brother of Salih, returned to the Sharqiyah with plans for risings there and in central Oman in May 1957. The Sharqiyah rising collapsed when Talib failed to return on time and Ibrahim fled to Muscat, where he was imprisoned. Talib then landed on the Batinah coast with a small group and made his way through the mountains to Bilad Sait; in July Sulayman escaped from Muscat to Jebel Akhdar, and Ghalib left Ghafat to join his brother and proclaim the restoration of the imamate.

The government attacked on 4 August with Muscat, British and Trucial Oman Scouts forces. Firq resisted strongly, but by 12 August government forces had taken Nizwa. Other towns followed, except those on Jebel Akhdar, to which Ghalib, Talib and Sulayman withdrew.

== Jebel Akhdar and defeat (1957–59) ==
From the mountain the Imam's supporters mined roads and ambushed convoys, while the Sultan's forces dynamited Tanuf and Bilad Sait. The final campaign began in November 1958, when government troops found an unguarded path up the mountain from Hajar and a squadron of the Special Air Service arrived from Malaya. Ghalib's forces attacked Tanuf and nearly expelled the government troops; the first pitched battle, around the cave complex at Aqabat al-Dhafar, took place in late December, and the Imam's forces held. A second SAS squadron arrived on 12 January 1959. On the evening of 26 January the SAS climbed a lightly guarded path from Kamah to the Imam's base at Habib; the Imam's troops surrendered, and the bases at Saiq and Sharaijah fell with little resistance. Talib, Ghalib and Sulayman escaped to the Sharqiyah and from there to Saudi Arabia.

== Exile ==
After the defeat of the imamate's forces by 1961, Ghalib and his allies began to seek Arab support for their cause in Egypt and Iraq. Radio Cairo broadcast propaganda, and the Arab League brought the "Oman question" before the United Nations, where it became a regular item on the General Assembly's agenda for the rest of Said bin Taimur's reign. Saudi Arabia supported Ghalib and his Oman Revolutionary Movement until the early 1970s, when Riyadh and the government of Sultan Qaboos bin Said moved towards diplomatic relations and the Saudis dropped their support.

== Death ==
Al Hinai continued to receive visitors from Oman up until his death and was well respected by the people of Oman. He died on 29 November 2009 at the age of 96 in Dammam.
