= Nur al-Din al-Salimi =

Omani scholar and historian

Imam Nur al-Din al-Salimi
- نور الدين أبو محمد عبد الله بن حميد بن سلوم بن عبيد بن خلفان بن خميس السالمي

Personal life
- Born: 1869 CE (1286 AH) Al-Hawqayn, Rustaq, Oman
- Died: 21 January 1914 (5 Rabīʿ al-Awwal 1332 AH) Tanuf, Oman
- Resting place: Tanuf, Oman
- Era: Late 19th–early 20th century
- Region: Oman
- Main interest(s): Islamic jurisprudence, usul al-fiqh, theology, hadith, Arabic grammar, Islamic history and poetry
- Notable work(s): Tuḥfat al-Aʿyān, Jawhar al-Niẓām, Maʿārij al-Āmāl, Ṭalʿat al-Shams, Mashāriq Anwār al-ʿUqūl, Bahjat al-Anwār, Talqīn al-Ṣibyān
- Known for: Religious scholarship, teaching, historical writing, and his role in the revival of the Imamate of Oman
- Occupation: Islamic scholar, jurist, theologian, historian and poet

Religious life
- Religion: Islam
- Denomination: Ibadi (Ahl al-Istiqāmah)
- School: Wahbi-Mahbubi
- Movement: Omani Imamate revival

Muslim leader
- Teacher: Rashid ibn Sayf al-Lamki, Salih ibn Ali al-Harithi, Majid ibn Khamis al-Abri, Sa'id ibn Khalfan al-Kharusi, Muhammad ibn Salim al-Gharibi
- Students: Salim bin Rashid al-Kharusi, Muhammad bin Abdullah al-Khalili, Abu Zayd al-Riyami

Nur al-Dīn al-Sālimī (Arabic: نور الدين السالمي; c. 1286–1332 AH, 1869–1914 CE; full name Nur al-Dīn Abū Muḥammad ʿAbd Allāh ibn Ḥumayd ibn Sullūm al-Sālimī) was an Omani historian and scholar noted for his expertise in Ibāḍī Islam. Al-Sālimī is a very important figure in Oman with reference to his publications. Among his publications are Tuḥfat al-Aʿyān bi-sīrat ahl ʿUmān and Talqīn al-ṣibyān. Both references are taught in public schools.

== Biography ==
Al-Sālimī was born near Rustaq, in al-Ḥawqayn, and was at first educated mainly by his father, followed by tuition by various Omani scholars, gaining particular expertise in Ibāḍī Islam. Around the age of twelve he became blind.

Al-Sālimī's life was characterised by his work to re-establish the Imamate of Oman, which had been replaced under British imperial influence by the Albusaidi Sultans of Muscat. Al-Sālimī's teachers included men who had secured the election of Oman's only Imām of the nineteenth century, ʿAzzān ibn Qays (reigned 1868–71). His early life near Rustaq positioned him at the centre of Ibāḍī resistance to the Sultanate. As the focus of this activism shifted to the province of Sharqiyya, al-Sālimī moved to that region, between around 1886 and 1890. There he studied with Sheikh Sāliḥ ibn ʿAli al-Ḥārithī (1834–96), and, with the support of al-Ḥārithī, settled and began to teach in the village of al-Qābil.

=== Efforts to revive the imamate ===
In 1323 AH (1905) al-Sālimī met Sultan Faisal bin Turki and asked him to unite Oman under his own rule and govern by Islamic law. The Sultan rejected the conditions, suspecting that al-Sālimī's supporters would instead nominate his uncle as imam. Faisal later asked him to tutor his son Taimur and to found a school at Muscat, an offer al-Sālimī refused. Peterson counts the mutawwiʿah movements that al-Sālimī led among the causes of the religious revival that preceded 1913.

Between 1907 and 1911 his attempts to persuade the tribal leaders failed. ʿĪsā ibn Ṣāliḥ, who had succeeded his father as leader of the Hināwī tribes of the Sharqiyya, declined al-Sālimī's request that he lead the struggle against the Sultan, on the ground that the time was not ripe. Al-Sālimī then turned to Ḥimyar ibn Nāṣir al-Nabhānī (1874–1920), the leader of the Ghāfirī Banū Riyām in the Jabal al-Akhdar. After a tour of the interior in 1330 AH (1912) he met Ḥimyar at Tanūf, who promised financial and moral support and agreed to meet him there the following May to elect an imam.

=== The imamate of 1913 ===
The assembly at Tanūf in May 1913 elected Sālim ibn Rāshid al-Kharūṣī, a former pupil of al-Sālimī and, through the marriage of al-Sālimī's daughter, his son-in-law. According to Hashimy, Sālim declined repeatedly; the scholars had him carried to the blind shaykh, who warned that a refusal would split the community and persuaded him to accept. See Salim bin Rashid al-Kharusi.

Under the new imam al-Sālimī was made president of the judges (qāḍīs), and Hashimy regards him as the main driving force of the imamate. He did not live to see its first year out: he died at Tanūf towards the end of January 1914, as the imamate was consolidating its hold on the interior. After his death the imam appointed ʿĀmir ibn Khamīs al-Mālikī, al-Sālimī's former pupil, to head the judges.

=== Death ===
According to the account given by his biographers, al-Sālimī died when his donkey stumbled as he travelled to visit one of his former teachers, Mājid ibn Khamīs al-ʿAbrī (c. 1837–1927). The two had fallen into a dispute because al-Sālimī had tried to appropriate charitable endowments intended for visiting graves and reading the Qurʾān for the dead to fund the campaign to re-establish the imamate. He was buried at Tanūf. Hashimy gives his years as 1283–1332 AH (1865–1914), earlier than the 1286 AH (1869) given above.${H(64)}

== Works ==
Al-Sālimī is thought to have begun writing around the age of seventeen, swiftly gaining fame as a scholar of religion and history. Al-Sālimī composed at least twenty-two works, including Talqīn al-ṣibyān, a book of instruction for children in Ibāḍī religion.

=== History of Oman ===
Although in his own community, al-Sālimī was most important as a religious thinker, he is best known in the West as a historian of Oman, and especially for his history of Oman, Tuḥfat al-Aʿyān bi-sīrat ahl ʿUmān, completed around 1913, shortly before his death. The work only appeared in print in 1928, edited by Abū Isḥāq Ibrāhīm Aṭfayyish, son of al-Sālimī's collaborator Muḥammad ibn Yūsuf Aṭfayyish (1236-1332/1820-1914), a noted Mzābi scholar and activist.

The Tuḥfat al-Aʿyān is noted for bringing together the manuscript sources composed up to al-Sālimī's time, for providing thorough citations and accurate quotations, and for being comprehensive in presenting available information about Oman; at the same time, the work is in the style of traditional Omani history-writing rather than modern history-writing. The work was influential on later scholars. On the other hand, the history has been seen as promoting al-Sālimī's ibādī politics.

== Family and legacy ==
Al-Sālimī's daughter Zaynah was the first wife of Imam Sālim; she died around 1336 AH (1916) and left two sons, Yaḥyā (born 1913) and ʿAbd Allāh (born 1916).${H(54)} His son Muḥammad (1896–1985) accompanied him as reader and guide, served Imam Sālim and the later imam al-Khalīlī as governor of Mudhaybi and Nakhal, and continued his father's Tuḥfat al-Aʿyān down to the death of Imām Muḥammad bin ʿAbd Allāh al-Khalīlī in 1954 in a work entitled Nahḍat al-aʿyān bi-ḥurriyyat ʿUmān (published in Cairo), and in this including a long biography of al-Sālimī.
