= Himyar bin Nasir al-Nabhani =

Omani tribal leader and shaykh of the Bani Riyam (died 1920)

- حمير بن ناصر النبهاني
- Born: 1874 or 1861
- Died: April 1920
- Occupation: Tribal leader
- Known for: Paramount shaykh of the Ghafiri faction; convened the assembly at Tanuf (1913)
- Children: Sulayman bin Himyar

Himyar bin Nasir bin Sayf al-Nabhani (Arabic: حمير بن ناصر بن سيف النبهاني; died April 1920) was the paramount shaykh (tamimah) of the Bani Riyam and of the Ghafiri tribal faction in the interior of Oman in the early twentieth century. From his base at Tanuf, at the foot of the Jebel Akhdar, he called the assembly of May 1913 that elected Salim bin Rashid al-Kharusi as Imam, and he supplied the new imamate with money and men. He died in April 1920, three months before the Imam was assassinated; the British political agent regarded his death as a decisive weakening of the Omani side.

== Background ==
Himyar belonged to the Nabhani family of the Bani Riyam, a Ghafiri tribe of Tanuf and the Jebel Akhdar whose headquarters lay at Tanuf and Barkat al-Mawz, and which Himyar controlled in its entirety. Hashimy gives his birth as 1291 AH (1874) in one passage and 1281 AH (1861) in another, and his death as 1338 AH (1920) in both. (Note: Hashimy writes "(1291/1874–1338/1920)" on p. 66 and "(1281/1861–1338/1920)" on p. 206.)

In the first years of the century the Bani Riyam had suffered under the Sultan's governor, Sulayman bin Suwaylim, who interfered in their internal affairs and encouraged their traditional rivals, the Hinawi Bani Ruwaha, to encroach on their land. Hashimy sees Sultan Faisal's favour towards the Hinawi against the Ghafiri as an important reason why Himyar turned towards the idea of an imamate.

== The revival of the imamate ==
=== Alliance with al-Salimi ===
In 1330 AH (1912) the scholar Abdullah bin Humaid al-Salimi visited Tanuf during a tour of the interior and set out his plan to Himyar, who agreed to support it. He promised both financial and moral backing and undertook to meet al-Salimi at Tanuf the following May to elect an imam.

Hashimy discusses the motives of Himyar at length. He rejects the view of Landen, followed by some Arab writers, that Himyar acted only for the interests of his tribe and his family. In Hashimy's judgement there was strong competition between the Hinawi and the Ghafiri to lead the imamate, and the pressure of Sultan Faisal on the Ghafiri made an imamate attractive to Himyar. But his main motive, Hashimy argues, was religious: the Bani Riyam had taken no part in the imamate of Azzan bin Qais (1868–71) and had suffered loss of property and hostility as a result. Peterson, for his part, counts Himyar and Isa bin Salih al-Harthi among the "secular ambitions" of the two major shaykhs of the interior that contributed to the revival.

=== The assembly at Tanuf ===
In May 1913 (Jumada II 1331 AH) Himyar convened at Tanuf the assembly of Ghafiri and Hinawi tribal leaders and about seventy-five scholars under al-Salimi, which agreed to revive the imamate and elected Salim bin Rashid al-Kharusi. Peterson writes that "at the beginning" Himyar's role "was by far the most important" of the tribal leaders'; the election of 1913, he adds, was a case in which Himyar had taken the lead in securing a candidate favourable to him. When the first meeting was held at Tanuf the Imam and his followers had very little money: al-Salimi had borrowed 300 Maria Theresa thalers for the occasion.

=== Support to the Imam ===
Himyar undertook to provide the Imam's army with about a thousand armed men at his own expense, and the Imam relied heavily on his followers. Hashimy counts him as the first of the main pillars of the imamate, supporting it "materially and morally". The Bani Riyam as a whole, once Himyar had decided, exerted great efforts for the imamate. Himyar and Isa bin Salih also acted together as the Imam's emissaries: after the fall of Samail in 1913, Isa was sent to Rustaq and Himyar to Bahla to win over the local rulers.

== Death and succession ==
Himyar died in April 1920 and was succeeded as leader of the Bani Riyam by his young son Sulayman. The political agent Ronald Wingate wrote that "the Imam was the figurehead, Isa the brains and Hamyar the strength of the Omani party", and urged that this was the time to strike, since "one of the three great personal factors on the Omani side is eliminated". Sulayman bin Himyar did not follow his father's role: when the Imam called for help against Sayyid Ahmad bin Ibrahim in 1920 the shaykhs, including Sulayman, ignored him, and when the notables later gave their allegiance to the new Imam he sent a representative instead of attending himself.

== See also ==
- Imamate of Oman
- Salim bin Rashid al-Kharusi
- Isa bin Salih al-Harthi
- Treaty of Seeb
