= Jebel Akhdar =

Jebel Akhdar or Djebel Akhdar (English: The Green Mountain) may be:

- Jebel Akhdar (Libya), wooded highland area
  - Jabal al Akhdar, a district in Libya
- Jebel Akhdar (Oman)
  - Jebel Akhdar War, 1954-1959
