= Isa bin Salih al-Harthi =

Omani tribal leader (died 1365 AH)

- عيسى بن صالح الحارثي
- Died: 1365 AH (c. 1945–46)
- Occupations: Tribal leader and negotiator
- Known for: Paramount shaykh of the Hinawi faction; principal Omani signatory of the Treaty of Seeb (1920)
- Relatives: Salih bin Ali al-Harthi (father); Ali bin Salih al-Harthi (brother)

Isa bin Salih al-Harthi (Arabic: عيسى بن صالح الحارثي; died 1365 AH, about 1945–46) was the paramount shaykh (tamimah) of the Hinawi tribal faction of Oman in the early twentieth century, based at al-Qabil in the Sharqiyah. He succeeded his father, Salih bin Ali al-Harthi, as leader of the Hinawi.

Isa is best known for his ambivalent part in the revival of the Ibadi imamate in 1913. Contemporary and later historians describe a shaykh whose inclinations lay with the Sultan in Muscat but who, under pressure from the scholars and from his own tribesmen, gave his oath of allegiance to Salim bin Rashid al-Kharusi and then spent much of the next seven years trying to broker a settlement. He fought at the attack on Muscat in January 1915, where he was wounded and his brother was killed, and in 1920 he was the principal Omani negotiator and signatory of the Treaty of Seeb with Sultan Taimur bin Feisal.

== Background ==
Isa belonged to the al-Harthi, a leading tribe of the Sharqiyah, and succeeded his father Salih bin Ali as tamimah of the Hinawi. His father Salih bin Ali died in 1314 AH (1896–97). A British sketch of the careers of Salih bin Ali and his son Isa, written by Murphy and held in the India Office records, treated the two men together as restless figures of Omani politics.

=== Relations with Sultan Faisal ===
Under Sultan Faisal bin Turki (r. 1888–1913), Isa's relations with the government were generally friendly, although he could act independently of it. In 1901 he prevented the British officer Captain Cox from travelling to Wadi Fulayj to examine a possible coal-mining site. In January 1907 the Sultan's governor Sulayman bin Suwaylim was sent to speak with Isa at al-Qabil; on his way back he was shot dead from a cliff in Wadi al-Aqq.

Together with his brother Ali bin Salih, he encouraged the Sultan to give his son Taimur a religious education, an idea that court figures later persuaded the Sultan to abandon.

=== The scholars' appeals ===
The Ibadi scholar Abdullah bin Humaid al-Salimi repeatedly asked Isa to lead a movement against the Sultan. According to Hashimy, Isa declined between 1907 and 1911 on the ground that the time was not ripe, and in 1911 he and other notables persuaded al-Salimi to put off a planned journey to North Africa to seek funds. An earlier attempt to revive the imamate in 1903, in which Isa is said to have joined Said bin Ibrahim, ruler of Rustaq, is noted by Peterson.

== The imamate of 1913 ==
=== Allegiance to the Imam ===
After the assembly at Tanuf and the election of Salim bin Rashid al-Kharusi in May 1913, Isa did not at first respond to the Imam's invitations. He waited about a month, writing meanwhile to the Sultan and to the Sultan's secretary, Rashid bin Uzayyiz, that he felt bound to answer a call "in God's name" and that the tribes of the interior were being drawn to the Imam. He reached Izki on 17 Rajab 1331 (22 June 1913), where al-Salimi and Amir al-Maliki went to his lodging to persuade him; he then swore allegiance at the Habib Mosque together with the notables of his tribe. Hashimy notes that this was a month after the imamate was founded and that Isa came under "considerable pressure", and he questions the claim of some earlier writers that Isa had been a driving force of the revival.

His adherence gave the new imamate "power and coherence", and other tribal leaders followed within days.

=== Mediation and the campaigns of 1913–14 ===
Isa's aim at Izki had been to mediate. He proposed that the Imam keep the territory he had taken and give up his plan to attack the Sama'il valley, and that a lasting peace be made with the Sultan. The Imam and al-Salimi rejected the proposal and forbade him to publicise it, and the dispute strained relations between the two men and their followers until the Hajriyin shaykhs intervened.

In August 1913 the Imam sent Isa to Rustaq to obtain the allegiance of its ruler, Sayyid Ahmad bin Ibrahim, whom Isa brought to the Imam at Sama'il on 22 August. He also besieged the fort of Bidbid with about two hundred men. In late 1913 Hamdan bin Zayid of Abu Dhabi, who had come to Muscat, wrote to Isa and al-Salimi and then held talks with Isa at al-Sib. Despite opposition from his followers, Isa met the Sultan in Muscat on 9 December 1913, and carried the proposed terms back to the Imam, who referred them to his council and rejected the terms.

=== The attack on Muscat ===
Isa disagreed with the Imam over the cost of the planned attack on Muscat and withheld his cooperation until funds were found; the Ottoman entry into the First World War in November 1914 and the accompanying call for jihad led him to drop his opposition. By November 1914 a British report stated that he "had definitely thrown in his lot with the Imam". In the battle at the gates of Muscat in January 1915 the Imam's forces were defeated; the British account records that "the rebel chief Isa bin Salih" was wounded and his brother killed. Afterwards the Imam delegated Isa to represent him in talks at al-Sib with Shaykh al-Naimi, who came with Sayyid Nadir bin Faisal.

In 1916 he led the first attack on Rustaq, after the Imam's forces had taken Bahla.

== Negotiator of the Treaty of Seeb ==
In 1920, after the death of Imam Salim, the Omani tribal leaders chose Muhammad bin Abdullah al-Khalili as Imam. The agreement concluded at Seeb in September of that year was drawn up between "the Government of Sultan Saiyid Taimur bin Faisal and Sheikh Isa bin Salah bin Ali al-Harthi on behalf of the Omanis", with the British Political Agent, Wingate, as mediator. In the account quoted by Peterson, the word "Imam" was left out of the text and the interior was represented by Isa alone as "the Omani tribes". The treaty is described in more detail in the article on the Treaty of Seeb.

== Death ==
Isa died in 1365 AH, which corresponds to 1945–46. Hashimy's thesis gives the Gregorian equivalent as 1942 in one place and 1946 in another. (Note: Hashimy lists "Sh. 'Isa b. Salih al-Harthi (d. 1365/1942)" on p. 89 and "(d. 1365/1946)" on p. 239. Since 1365 AH began in November 1945, 1946 (or late 1945) is the date that agrees with the Hijri year.)

== Assessment ==
Historians disagree about Isa's place in the imamate. Early writers such as Qasim, al-Aqqad and Landen present him as one of the architects of the revival; Hashimy argues instead that he was a late, reluctant participant whose political preference was for the Sultan, and that he remained a "good friend of the Sultan" until the Imam decided to attack Muscat. The same pattern, of a leader who joined the imamate to preserve his standing with his tribes but worked throughout for a negotiated peace, runs through his mediations of 1913, 1915 and 1920.

== See also ==
- Imamate of Oman
- Treaty of Seeb
- Salim bin Rashid al-Kharusi
- Muhammad bin Abdullah al-Khalili
