= Treaty of Seeb =

1920 treaty in Oman

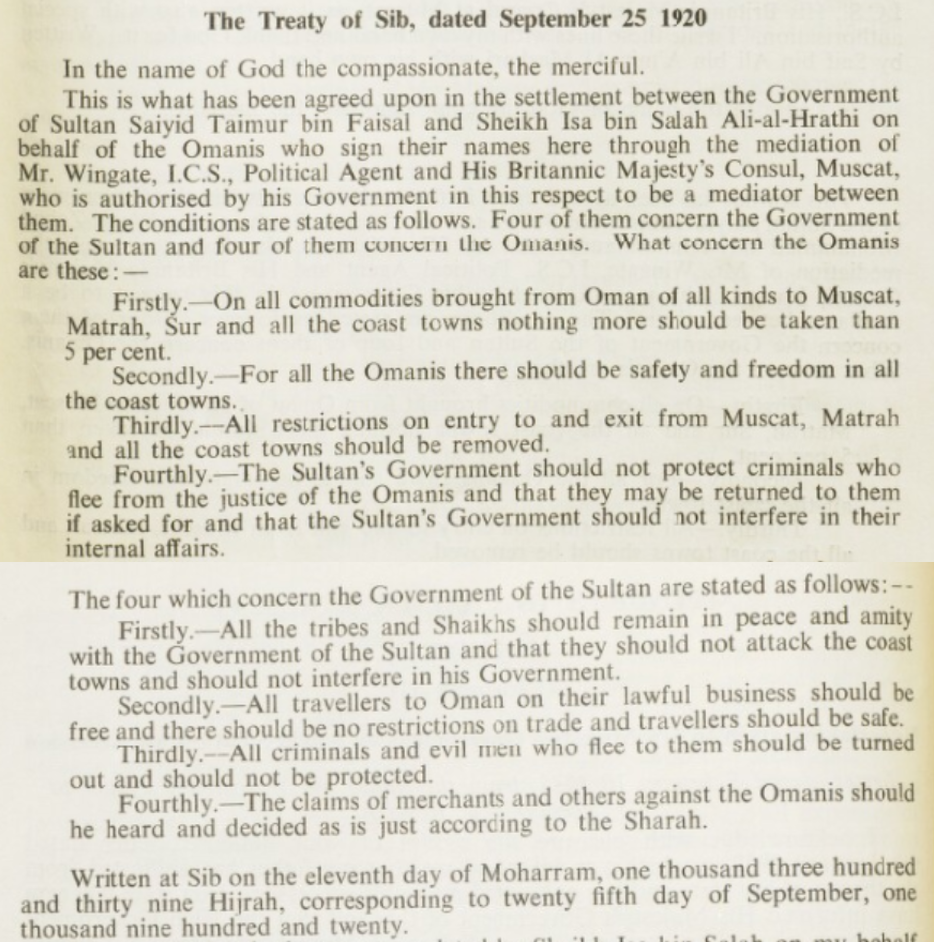
1920 Treaty of Seeb

The Treaty of Seeb (variously Sib or As Sib) was an agreement reached between the Sultan of Muscat, Taimur bin Feisal, and the Imamate of Oman on 25 September 1920. The treaty granted autonomy to the imamate in the interior of Oman but recognized the sovereignty of the Sultanate of Muscat. On the Omani side the settlement was negotiated and signed by the Hinawi leader Isa bin Salih al-Harthi on behalf of the tribes, after the assassination of Imam Salim in July 1920 and the election of Muhammad bin Abdullah al-Khalili as his successor. The treaty was named after Seeb (as-Sib), a coastal town in present-day Oman.

== History ==
The Imamate has appeared in cycles for more than 1,200 years in Oman, at times succeeding in expelling the Portuguese colonizers out of southeast Arabia and establishing a thalassocracy that extended its power towards the Persian Gulf and East Africa. The British imperial development in the coastal of Oman, the Sultanate of Muscat, led to the renewed revival of the Imamate cause in the interior of Oman. The Omanis despised the tyrannical way of ruling and the vast British control over the Sultanate. The revival was led by Imam Salim ibn Rashid al-Kharusi who instigated an anti-Muscat rebellion (1913–1920) among the conservative Ibadi sect in the interior Oman and reestablished the Imamate in opposition to Muscat. The Imamate of Oman, similar to the Sultanate, was ruled by the Ibadi sect but the former differed politically as it opposed foreign interference in internal affairs and believed that the ruler should be elected. With British assistance by mediator Ronald Wingate, the Treaty of Seeb was signed on September 25, 1920. The capital of the Imamate was established in the town of Nizwa, one of the traditional centers of power in Oman's history. Imam Salim ibn Rashid al-Kharusi was murdered in July 1924 and a new Imam, Muhammad bin Abdullah AlKhalili, was elected.

Relationships between Muscat and Oman were relatively peaceful until 1945 when news broke out that Imam Alkhalili was ill. Sultan Said bin Taimur expressed his interest to the British government in occupying the Imamate right after the death of the Imam and take advantage of potential instability that may occur within the Imamate when elections were due. Following the death of Imam AlKhalili, Imam Ghalib Alhinai was elected in 1954. The entry and occupation of Fahud on 25 October 1954, an area located within the interior of Oman, by the Muscat Infantry led by Lieutenant Colonel Coriat was considered by the Imamate to be a breach to the Treaty of Seeb, which triggered the Jebel Akhdar War. In 1955 Sultan Said bin Taimour occupied the capital, Nizwa. Saudi Arabia, following the Buraimi Dispute, Egypt and Iraq supported the Imamate's cause. The brother of the new Imam, Sheikh Talib bin Ali Alhinai, who fled to Saudi Arabia then Egypt, gradually restarted the Jebel Akhdar rebellion and eventually re-joined his followers in Oman. Following direct intervention by the British forces, including the Royal Air Force and Special Air Service, the war ended in 1959 with the defeat of the rebels and the exiling of the leaders to Saudi Arabia.

== Text ==
This is what has been agreed upon in the settlement between the Government of the Sultan Saiyid Taimur bin Faisal and Shaikh Isa bin Salah bin Ali Al-Harthi on behalf of the Omanis who sign their names here through the mediation of Mr. Wingate, I.C.S Political Agent and his Britannic Majesty's Consul, Muscat, who is authorised by his Government in this respect to be a mediator between them. The conditions are stated as follows. Four of them concern the Government of the Sultan and four of them concern the Omanis. What concern the Omanis are these.

Firstly. On all commodities brought from Oman of all kinds to Muscat, Matrah, Sur and all the coast towns nothing more should be taken than 5 percent.
Secondly. For all the Omanis there should be safety and freedom in all the coast towns.
Thirdly. All restrictions on entry to and exit from Muscat, Matrah and all the coast towns should be removed.
Fourthly. The Sultan's government should not protect criminals who flee from the justice of the Omanis and that they may be returned to them if asked for and that the Sultan's Government should not interfere in their internal affairs.

The four which concern the Government of the Sultan are stated as follows:-

Firstly. All the tribes and Shaikhs should remain in peace and amity with the Government of the Sultan and that they should not attack the coast towns and should not interfere in his Government.
Secondly. All travellers to Oman on their lawful business should be free and there should be no restrictions on trade and travellers should be safe.
Thirdly. All criminals and evil men who flee to them should be turned out and should not be protected.
Fourthly. The claims of merchants and others against the Omanis should be heard and decided as is just according to the Sharah.

Written at Sib on the eleventh day of Moharram one thousand three hundred and thirty nine Hijrah, corresponding to twenty fifth day of September one thousand nine hundred and twenty.
