= Faisal ibn Turki =

Faisal ibn Turki may refer to:

- Faisal bin Turki Al Busaidi (1864–1913), Sultan of Muscat and Oman
- Faisal bin Turki Al Saud (1785–1865), ruler of the Second Saudi State and head of the House of Saud
- Faisal bin Turki I Al Saud (1918–1968), Saudi royal
- Faisal bin Turki Al Saud (born 1975), a Saudi prince
