= Jebel Akhdar War =

1950s rebellion in Oman

- Part of the decolonisation of Asia and the Arab Cold War
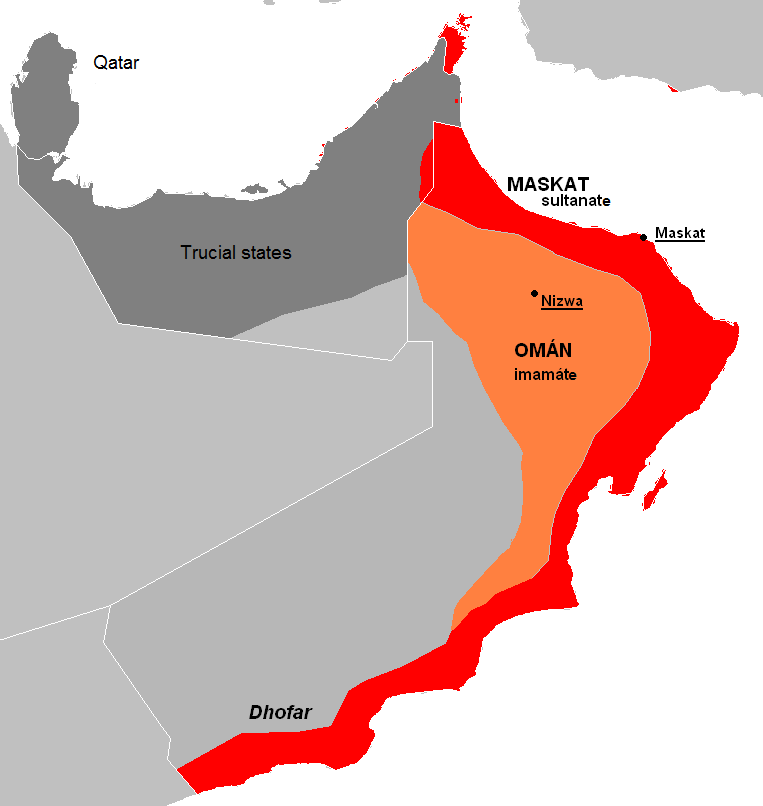
- The split between the interior region (orange) and the coastal region (red) of Oman and Muscat
Date	10 October 1954 – 30 January 1959 (4 years, 3 months and 5 days)
Location	Sultanate of Muscat and Oman
Result	Muscati victory: Defeat of the Imamate of Oman; 2073, 2238 and 2302 'Question of Oman' resolutions adopted by the UN General Assembly
Territorial changes	Dissolution of the Imamate of Oman

Belligerents
Sultanate of Muscat; United Kingdom	Imamate of Oman; Supported by: Republic of Egypt; Saudi Arabia

Commanders and leaders
Said bin Taimur; David Smiley; Tony Drummond	Ghalib al-Hinai; Talib Alhinai; Sulayman bin Himyar

Strength
107 SAF; 123 MR; 476 NFR (United Kingdom) 250 SAS (United Kingdom) 2 Scout Car troops (United Kingdom) 8 RM and RAF; Total: 1,000	300 rebels Total: 1,000

Casualties and losses
1958 air campaigns: (United Kingdom) 1 pilot killed 1959 offensive: (United Kingdom) 13 troops killed (United Kingdom) 57 wounded	1958 air campaigns: Several dozen killed or wounded 1959 offensive 176 killed 57 wounded
- Total: 213–523+ killed (Note: Casualties breakdown (213-523+ killed): 1957 Battle of Bilad Sait – Omani regiment (300 men) suffered significant casualties and as a result was disbanded; in addition, 3 dead 5 wounded among Omani forces in Tanuf. 1958 air campaigns – one British pilot killed, significant number of rebels killed and wounded. About 20–30 rebels killed in December 1958. 1959 offensive – 13 British and Muscat troops killed, 57 wounded; 176 Omanis killed, 57 wounded.)

The Jebel Akhdar War (Arabic: حرب الجبل الأخضر, romanized: Ḥarb al-Jebel el-ʾAkhḍar, lit. 'the Green Mountain War'), also known as the Jebel Akhdar Rebellion or the Oman War (Arabic: حرب عمان, romanized: Ḥarb ʻumān), broke out in 1954 and again in 1957 in Oman, as an effort by the local Omanis in the interior of Oman led by their elected Imam, Ghalib al-Hinai, to protect the Imamate of Oman from the occupation plans of Said bin Taimur, sultan of Muscat and Oman, backed by the British government. The latter parties were eager to gain access to the oil wells in the interior lands of Oman. Sultan Said received direct financing to raise an armed force to occupy the Imamate of Oman from Iraq Petroleum Company (IPC), a consortium of oil companies that was predominately owned by companies known today as Shell, Total, ExxonMobil and British Petroleum (BP). The latter was majority-owned by the British government.

The Imamate was eventually supported by Arab states. The war lasted until 1959, when the British armed forces decided to intervene directly by launching air and ground attacks on the Imamate. With that help, the Sultanate won the war. The declarations signed by the sultans of Muscat to consult the British government on all important matters, the unequal trade treaties signed by the two sides favoring British interests, the cession of the Omani Kuria Muria islands to the British, and the vast control over the Sultanate's government ministries, including defense and foreign affairs, exerted by the British rendered the Sultanate a de facto British colony. The United Nations General Assembly adopted the 'Question of Oman' resolution in 1965, 1966 and again in 1967; it called upon the British government to cease all repressive action against the locals, and end British control over Oman. It reaffirmed the inalienable right of the Omani people to self-determination and independence.

== Background ==
In the mid-18th century, Ahmed bin Sa'id Al Busaidi expelled the Persians from Oman and became the elected Imam of Oman, with Rustaq as its capital. Following Imam Ahmed's death in 1783, his son, Said bin Ahmed became the elected Imam. Afterwards, a hereditary line of succession ruled by Al Busaidi Sultans started in Muscat during the 19th century, except for a short period of time when Azzan bin Qais became an elected Imam (1868–1871). The British Empire was keen to dominate southeast Arabia to stifle the growing power of other European states and to curb the Omani maritime power that grew during the 17th century. The British Empire thus made the decision to back the Al Busaidi monarchy of Muscat towards the end of 18th century. The British Empire over time began to establish a series of treaties with the sultans with the objective of advancing British political and economic interest in Muscat, while granting the sultans military protection. By the end of the 19th century, Muscat became increasingly dependent on British loans and remained in an underdeveloped state. The British government maintained administrative control over the Sultanate as the defense secretary and chief of intelligence, chief adviser to the sultan and all ministers except for two were British. The British Political Agent, who resided in Muscat, described the influence of the British government over Muscat as completely "self interested" and paid no attention to the social and political conditions of the locals, which began to alienate the interior of Oman.

Tension between the interior of Oman, the Imamate of Oman, and the Sultanate of Muscat started to rise in the late 19th century and early 20th century. The Imamate, similar to the Sultanate, was ruled by the Ibadi sect, however, the dispute between both parties was for the most part political. The Imamate, which has appeared in cycles for more than 1,200 years in Oman, rejected the growing influence of the British Empire over Muscat and Oman. The Omanis in the interior remained consistently opposed to foreign influence over Oman. In 1913, Imam Salim AlKharusi instigated an anti-Muscat rebellion that lasted until 1920 when the Imamate established peace with the Sultanate through the signing of Treaty of Seeb that was brokered by Britain, which had no economic interest in the interior of Oman during that point of time. The treaty granted autonomous rule to the Imamate in the interior of Oman and recognized the sovereignty of the coastal of Oman, the Sultanate of Muscat.

After the discovery of oil wells in other parts of the Arabian Gulf, British oil companies were keen to search for oil in Oman. On 10 January 1923, an agreement between the Sultanate and the British government was signed in which the Sultanate had to consult with the British Political Agent residing in Muscat and obtain the approval of the High Government of India in order to extract oil in the Sultanate. On 31 July 1928, the Red Line Agreement was signed between Anglo-Persian Company (later renamed British Petroleum), Royal Dutch/Shell, Compagnie Française des Pétroles (later renamed Total), Near East Development Corporation (later renamed ExxonMobil) and Calouste Gulbenkian (an Armenian businessman) to collectively produce oil in the post-Ottoman Empire region, which included the Arabian peninsula, with each of the four major companies holding 23.75 percent of the shares while Calouste Gulbenkian held the remaining 5 percent shares. The agreement stipulated that none of the signatories was allowed to pursue the establishment of oil concessions within the agreed on area without including the other stakeholders, yet other oil companies that were not part of the agreement had the opportunity of pursuing oil concessions individually, which ensued Standard Oil Company of California (later renamed Chevron) to win an oil concession with Saudi Arabia in 1933. In the following year, 1929, the members of the agreement established Iraq Petroleum Company (IPC).

When Said bin Taimur became the ruler of Sultanate of Muscat, the defense of the region was guaranteed by treaties with Britain. The only armed forces in Muscat were tribal levies and a palace guard recruited from Baluchistan in Pakistan (due to a historical quirk by which the sultan also owned the port of Gwadar). Sultan Said signed a declaration, similar to the one signed by his predecessor, his father, to consult the British government on all important matters, including oil concessions.

In 1937, an agreement between the sultan and a subsidiary of IPC, operated by British oil companies, was signed to grant oil concessions to IPC, in which the sultan received a sizable signature bonus. IPC, after failing to discover oil in the Sultanate region, informed the sultan that oil reserves may exist in the interior of Oman and offered financial support to raise an armed force against any potential resistance by the Imamate. The British government favored IPC's plan as it sought benefits from the expansion of the Sultanate's territory and considered oil discovery in Oman as a valuable insurance against the insecurity of other parts of the Middle East. Sultan Said, who had the backing of the British government, ruled with an iron fist and followed a non-development policy, while prohibiting anything that he considered "decadent" and any form of criticism. On 20 December 1951, a Treaty of Friendship was signed between the United Kingdom and the Sultanate wherein the Sultanate shall not prohibit or restrict the movement of goods imported from the United Kingdom or exported to the United Kingdom, which shall not extend to the exportation or importation restrictions to any other country, with few exceptions.

Prior to 1954, there was a dispute between the Sultanate and Saudi Arabia over the ownership of the Buraimi Oasis, an area which was known to have oil reserves. In early 1953, the Sultanate prepared a force of 500 to deal with the seizure of Buraimi by Saudi Arabia and protect the Trucial States against further Saudi encroachments. In August 1953, Muscat forces were preparing to advance on Buraimi but the British government asked the sultan to withhold, pending negotiations for a peaceful settlement. In October 1955, under the order of the United Kingdom Prime Minister Eden, the British military entered Buraimi and declared the area as part of the Sultanate. The dispute on the ownership of Buraimi carried on throughout the period of the war between the Sultanate and the Imamate.

== Early planning ==
Planning by the Sultanate to advance on the interior of Oman started early in 1945 as news broke out that Imam Alkhalili, the predecessor to Imam al-Hinai, was ill. Sultan Said bin Taimur expressed his interest to the British government in occupying the Imamate right after the death of the Imam and take advantage of potential instability that may occur within the Imamate when elections were due. The idea of having the oil company attempt to negotiate directly with the interior of Oman was not favored by the British Political Agent who resided in Muscat, providing the justification that it would mean recognizing the authority of the Imamate and, therefore, increase its prestige. The British Political Agent believed that the only method of gaining access to the oil reserves in the interior was by assisting the sultan in taking over the Imamate. The position of the British government, thereafter, was to eliminate any potential of entering into direct relations with the interior to avoid alienating the sultan and to avoid invalidating the claim of IPC that its concession from the sultan covers the entirety of Oman, not just the Sultanate region. Sultan Said believed that the old rivalry between the two main communities in the interior of Oman, Hinawis and Ghafiris, would reappear when it was time to elect a new Imam and worked towards achieving this end. With British aid, Sultan Said attempted to court many of the Ghafiris as early as 1937 to break from the Imamate, however, such attempts proved to be unsuccessful later on. In 1946, the British government offered arms and ammunition, auxiliary supplies and officers to prepare the sultan in the endeavor of occupying the Imamate. In September 1946, the British government assessed the proposal of using the British Royal Air Force (RAF) to occupy the interior of Oman. The British government concluded that it was "in principle" reluctant to the use of force that might lead to international criticism and the calling of the British government before the Security Council of the United Nations, while it recognized that the use of RAF would expedite oil explorations in the interior of Oman. On 3 May 1954, Imam Alkhalili died and Ghalib al-Hinai, who previously served as a judge and assistant to Imam Alkhalili, was elected.

== Timeline ==
=== First conflict (1954–1955) ===
The war was triggered by Sultan Said, on 10 October 1954, when he first licensed IPC oil prospectors to search for oil near Fahud, an area located within the territory of the Imamate, and sent forces to occupy it. The move was determined by the Imamate to be a breach of the Treaty of Seeb, an agreement which recognized its autonomy. On the next day, the Sultanate's forces moved to capture Tanam. The occupation of Fahud and Tanam was only a prelude to a grand design by the Sultanate to occupy the entire Imamate. On 13 December 1954, the Muscat and Oman Field Force (MOFF), later renamed Sultan of Oman's Armed Forces (SAF), which had eight British officers among its troops, marched from Fahud to Adam and occupied it. Thereupon, the capital of the Imamate, Nizwa, was captured by the Sultanate on 15 December 1955. The Imamate was therefore temporarily defeated and the red flag of the Sultanate flew over the interior for the first time in half a century. However, the Wali of Rustaq and the younger brother of the Imam, Talib al-Hinai, fled to Saudi Arabia and then to Cairo (Egypt) in order to seek Arab support in the war against the Sultanate.

=== Arab states support of the Imamate ===
The rise of anti-imperialism and pro Arab-unity in the Arab world led by President Gamal Abdel Nasser prompted Egypt and Iraq to back the Imamate's cause in the Jebel Akhdar War. The interior of Oman established an Omani Imamate Office in Cairo (Egypt). The dispute over Buraimi between the Sultanate and Saudi Arabia, as well as Saudi Arabia's attempt to overshadow President Nasser's prominence in the Arab world, triggered Saudi's support to the Imamate. The United States took the position of not interfering in the conflict as per the statement made by the Secretary of State, John Dulles, in a press conference in August 1957 and made no attempts to mediate between the involved parties after the Imamate appealed to the US through the latter's embassy in Cairo to solve the conflict by seeking peaceful negotiations with Britain. The US interest rested on both sides of the opposing parties as it had shares in Saudi Aramco Company, which was owned by Standard Oil Company of California (later renamed Chevron), and in IPC, which was partially owned by Near East Development Corporation (later renamed ExxonMobil), who were both competing for oil concessions in the Arabian peninsula, as well as, being an ally to both Saudi Arabia and Britain, who had a dispute over Buraimi Oasis.

=== Second conflict (1957–1959) ===
==== Counterattack launched by the Imamate ====
Talib bin Ali al-Hinai, the Imam's brother, who fled to Saudi Arabia then Egypt, returned to Oman in 1957 with 300 well-equipped Omani fighters landing at Albatinah coast. A second group of fighters landed in Qalhat and made its way to Bidiya, where clashes erupted between both sides. Talib's plan was to divert the MOFF forces to Bidiya, away from the central part of Oman. Talib and his forces successfully made their way to central Oman, where they were joined by Imam Ghalib at Wadi Al-Ula. The insurrection broke out again when Talib's forces took hold of a fortified tower near Bilad Sayt, which the Field Force lacked the heavy weapons to destroy. The MOFF under the order of Lieutenant Colonel Cheeseman moved an artillery battery to Bilad Sayt in anticipation of an easy victory. However, the Imamate's forces proved to be much better organized than anticipated and the Bilad Sayt operation was abandoned. Talib's forces cut off the lines of communication of the MOFF and fought on various fronts in the interior of Oman, which culminated in capturing Bahla Fort. Suleiman bin Himyar, the Sheikh of one of the major tribes in the interior, openly proclaimed his defiance to the sultan, and began a general uprising. The MOFF was heavily ambushed at Tanuf, Kamah and Nizwa. Near Tanuf, the engagement between the MOFF and rebels resulted in the defeat of the MOFF and the loss of a substantial number of its military equipment, including nearly a dozen of its military vehicles. Major Anderson, one of the military officers of the MOFF, pursued the sultan to withdraw the forces to the desert and evacuate the interior of Oman, except for one military unit, which attempted to keep hold of Nizwa. The MOFF was largely destroyed as it attempted to retreat through hostile towns and villages that have supported the uprising. After weeks of skirmishes, with no civilian support from the locals in the interior, the rest of MOFF forces that remained in the interior parts of Oman had no choice but to surrender their way back to Fahud. The Imamate's forces freed Nizwa (capital), Firq, Izki, Tanuf, Bahla and Jabal Akhdar from the Sultunate's control, while Ibri was the only area that remained under the occupation of the Sultanate.

==== Reinforcement of the Sultanate's army ====
In July 1957, as a result of a series of losses in the interior of Oman, the British government extended its military aid to the sultan. Air Vice-Marshal Maurice Heath, who was the commander of the British Forces Arabian Peninsula, was ordered to assist the sultan's ground forces by air with supplies, including arms and ammunition, to move one company of the British Cameronians from Buraimi towards the interior and to attack one of the forts held by the Omanis. The British Foreign Office in Bahrain agreed with the sultan to conduct air strikes on water supplies and date gardens, when the picking season was just about to start, that belonged to the locals in the interior of Oman using RAF jets in July 1957. On 25 July 1958, owing to the Imamate's continued strong resistance, the British government made the decision to reinforce the Sultanate's forces and increase its direct military support on a considerably larger scale. Meanwhile, the British government had a general objective of being "less visible" in the Middle East in the post-Suez Crisis world, given the rise of anti-colonial sentiment in the Arab world during that period. Therefore, letters were exchanged between the sultan and the British leaders and subsequently an 'assistance in economic development' agreement was signed, which consisted of strengthening the Sultan of Oman's Armed Forces (SAF) by attaching British officers to lead small units and to head the SAF as a whole. After the buildup of forces and the development of a military strategy to attack the interior of Oman, the first offensive action came from the air when RAF de Havilland Venoms' 10 to 12 sorties of rockets targeted various locations of the Imamate. The RAF Venoms attacked Izki Fort, Nizwa Fort, Tanuf Fort and Birkat Almawz Fort. On the ground, one column was formed at Fahud to advance from there towards Nizwa, which was placed under the command of Lieutenant Colonel Stewart Carter, while another column was planned to move from Muscat and through Samail into the interior of Oman, which was put under the leadership of Lieutenant Colonel Frank Haugh. Both columns were placed under the command of Brigadier J.A.R. Robertson from the British Army. The advancement of the ground forces started at night from Fahud towards Izz and then Firq, where stiff opposition by Omani fighters compelled the Sultanate's forces to withdraw. The RAF then flew eight sorties, attacking Omani rebels and inflicting many casualties in Firq. The Cameronians, on the next day, succeeded in defeating the remaining resistance encountered at Firq, which opened a pathway for the Sultanate's forces to advance towards Nizwa. The rebellion at Nizwa was suppressed by the Muscat Regiment and the Trucial Oman Levies from the neighbouring Trucial States. The decisive factor was the direct support of soldiers from the British Special Air Service (SAS), 1st Battalion of the Cameronians, a troop of the 15/19 Hussars, RAF fighter jets and a squadron of Ferret armoured cars that the Sultanate received. Talib's forces retreated to the inaccessible Jebel Akhdar. The SAF's attacks up the few paths to the Jebel were easily repelled.

==== Stalemate ====
The sultan's army was reorganised under the British soldier, Colonel David Smiley. The Batinah Force was renamed to Northern Frontier Regiment (NFR) and the remnants of the Muscat and Oman Field Force were merged into the new Muscat Regiment (MR). Within each unit and sub-unit, Baluchi and Arab soldiers were mixed. This prevented units defecting or openly sympathising with the interior of Oman, but led to tensions within units, and orders were frequently not followed because of language problems. Many of the notionally Omani soldiers were recruited from the province of Dhofar, and were looked down upon by other Arabs.

The Army was still unable to deal with Talib's stronghold. The few paths up the Jebel Akhdar were far too narrow to deploy attacking battalions or even companies. One attempt was made against the southern face of the Jebel, using four infantry companies (including two companies from the Trucial Oman Scouts, from what would later become the United Arab Emirates). The attackers withdrew hastily after concluding they were vulnerable to being ambushed and cut off. In another attempt, infantry launched a feint and then withdrew while Avro Shackleton bombers of the RAF bombarded the supposedly massed defenders but they inflicted no casualties. De Havilland Venoms, flying from RAF Sharjah, were also used to bomb and strafe the mountainous strongholds of the rebels. For two years, rebel infiltrators continually mined the roads around the Jebel, and ambushed SAF and British detachments and oil company vehicles. The SAF were spread in small detachments in the towns and villages at the foot of the Jebel, and thus vulnerable and on the defensive. Their arms (mainly British weapons of World War II vintage) were less effective than the up-to-date equipment used by Talib's fighters. A SAF artillery unit, an all-Baluch unit under the control of Lieutenant Ashraf of the Pakistan Artillery, with two 5.5 inch medium guns harassed the settlements on the plateau on top of the Jebel Akhdar, but to little effect. RAF aircraft continued to attack the interior settlements on the plateau areas of the Jebel and remnants of these air attacks still exist – the wreckage of a crashed Venom FB4 jet and the grave of its pilot Flt Lt Clive Owen Watkinson, who was buried by the Omani locals, are located up on the Saiq Plateau.

==== Decisive British attack (1959) ====
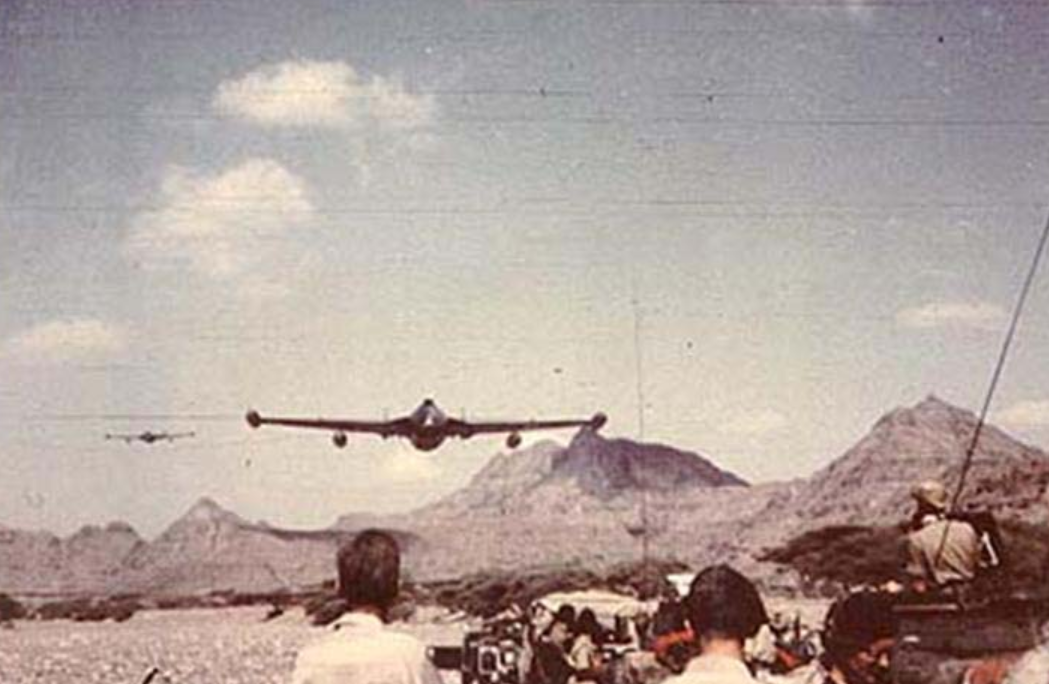
RAF Venom of 8 Squadron flying over Oman during Jebel Akhdar War

It was estimated by some British officers that a full-scale attack by a British brigade would be required to recapture the Jebel. David Smiley and Lieutenant Colonel Anthony Deane-Drummond concurred that additional SAS troops were needed and that one squadron was not enough to defeat the Imamate. Eventually, two squadrons from the British Special Air Service Regiment were deployed under Anthony Deane-Drummond. The low media coverage surrounding British squadron's operations in Oman helped Anthony Deane-Drummond convince the Far East Land Forces chief of staff and the British War Office Department to add another squadron. One squadron was chosen to be based at Tanuf, south of Jebel Akhdar, and the other squadron was based at various positions to the north of Jebel Akhdar. A tactical operations center was established in Nizwa under the command of David Smiley to coordinate the military operations of the Northern Frontier Regiment, Muscat Regiment, Trucial Oman Scouts and the SAS troops. The RAF Shackleton squadron was responsible for attacking the Jebel while the RAF Venoms were tasked with providing support to ground operations. The RAF made 1,635 raids, dropping 1,094 tons and firing 900 rockets at the interior of Oman between July and December 1958 targeting insurgents, mountain top villages and water channels.

On 18 December 1958, a SAS troop was within 20 yards from the Imamate's position when it was attacked, but a second SAS troop came for rescue. Both troops withdrew without any casualties. On the night of 27 December, two SAS troops assaulted Aqabat Aldhafar in order to establish a military base in the area from which the SAS could gain access to the mountain. The fighting continued until the next morning when the SAS troops, with the support of MR and NFR, were able to defeat the rebels, resulting in 20 rebel casualties. The last week of December entailed a large number of intense battles surrounding the mountain. After making feint operations against outlying positions on the north side of the Jebel Akhdar, SAS troops scaled the southern face of the Jebel at night, taking the rebels by surprise. Supplies were parachuted to them once they reached the plateau, which may have misled some of the rebels into thinking that this was an assault by paratroops. On 30 January 1959, the SAS occupied Saiq and Shuraijah, and there was little further resistance. Talib and his fighters either melted back into the local population or fled to Saudi Arabia. Imam Ghalib went into exile in Saudi Arabia. The casualties of the five-year conflict were hundreds of rebels killed, together with significant human cost to the British and Sultan's loyal troops. The decisive 1959 offensive resulted in the deaths of 13 of the Sultan's Armed Forces and British personnel, and 176 Omanis from the interior in the final month of fighting.

=== United Nations appeal ===
The Imamate resorted to international organizations, mainly the United Nations and the Arab League, in order to appeal for settling the conflict. Talib al-Hinai, who was the Wali (governor) of Rustaq, and Suleiman bin Hamyar, who was the Wali (governor) of Jebel Akhdar, presented the case of Oman in front of the Arab League and the United Nations in an attempt to seek recognition of the Imamate and to appeal against the actions of the British government. The Imamate's cause was thereafter closely identified with Arab nationalism and the various forms of anti-colonialism that were taking place during that period. In August 1957, the UN Security Council voted by a narrow margin (5 to 4 votes) not to consider a request for an urgent meeting to discuss "British aggression" against the interior of Oman. Britain, France, Australia, Colombia and Cuba voted against considering the charge of "British aggression" against Oman led by Arab states on the basis that the conflict constituted a "civil war" and a revolt against government authority. Sweden, Iraq, Soviet Union and the Philippines voted for the move on the basis that the war is an "international conflict" and the British government had violated the United Nations Charter by planning and directly interfering in the war against the interior of Oman. The United States abstained while China was counted as "not participating".

On 1 October 1960, 10 Arab states requested to place the case of Oman on the United Nations General Assembly agenda items for debate. On 11 December 1963, The UN General Assembly decided to establish an Ad-Hoc Committee on Oman in order to study the 'Question of Oman' and report back to the General Assembly. On 17 December 1965, the 'Question of Oman' resolution was adopted by the UN General Assembly, which criticized the government of the United Kingdom and the authorities in the territory for not cooperating with the Ad-Hoc committee on Oman by not allowing it to access the territory, called upon the United Kingdom's government to halt all oppressive actions against the locals and end British control over Oman. By a majority of votes, the UN General Assembly on 20 December 1966 and on 12 December 1967 adopted new resolutions to the 'Question of Oman' that called upon the British government to cease all repressive action against the locals, end British control over Oman and reaffirmed the inalienable right of the Omani people to self-determination and independence.

== British attacks controversy ==
Declassified information by the British National Archives later revealed that the British government deliberately destroyed Aflaj irrigation systems and crops by air strikes in order to prevent locals in the interior of Oman from gathering crops and denying them access to water supplies. Wadi Beni Habib and the water channel at Semail were among the water supplies that were deliberately damaged. Air strikes on Saiq and Sharaijah rendered cultivation in the areas "hazardous". Furthermore, these documents reveal that the British Foreign Secretary gave the approval on 4 August 1957 to carry out air strikes without prior warning to the locals residing in the interior of Oman. The ban on visas for the press by the Sultan and the ability of the British government to carry out air strikes discreetly using Masirah Airfield helped in sustaining the military operations under low profile. Britain had been at war in Oman for six-and-a-half years before British media outlets started publishing news about Jebel Akhdar War. The British political resident George Middleton in 1958 described the British involvement in the war as "yet another instance of our appearing to back an unpopular, undemocratic and selfish potentate, in fact to be thoroughly reactionary and 'imperialistic'".

On 29 July 1957, the House of Commons debated the Jebel Akhdar War under the title "Muscat and Oman". The Secretary of State for Foreign Affairs at the time, Selwyn Lloyd, while answering questions from members of the House of Commons, gave the impression that the Treaty of Seeb was broken by the Imamate stating "this agreement was broken by the tribes in the year or two prior to December, 1955, when the Imam, with foreign help, sought to establish a separate principality". However, British declassified documents later revealed that the Treaty of Seeb was broken much earlier, in July 1945, when it was first revealed that Sultan Said bin Taimur with the support of the British government planned to advance on the Imamate immediately after the death of Imam Alkhalili, the predecessor to Imam al-Hinai.

== Aftermath ==
With the defeat of the Imam, the Treaty of Seeb was terminated and the autonomous Imamate of Oman was abolished. The Imamate continued for a short time to lead a temporary government-in-exile from Dammam, Saudi Arabia and Egypt established an Imamate Office in Cairo, Egypt while the fighting continued in Oman. In the early 1960s, the Imam, exiled to Saudi Arabia and obtained the support from his host and other Arab governments, but this support ended in the 1980s. The 'Question of Oman' remained on the UN General Assembly agenda in each year until 1971. The Imamate's cause continued to be promoted up until 1970.

The British RAF made 2,080 sorties, dropped 1,750 tons of bombs and fired 3,843 rocket projectiles during the air campaign period against the interior of Oman. Britain's Middle East Development Division, estimated that 90 percent of the houses in Jebel Akhdar were damaged, of which 50 percent were completely destroyed. The appointed military governor of Jebel Akhdar, Lieutenant Colonel Maxwell, filed reports which reveal that the Aflaj water channels and reservoirs in all Jebel Akhdar villages had been damaged.

Despite the defeat, some insurgents continued to cross into Oman from Saudi Arabia or via the UAE, and laid land mines which continued to cause casualties to SAF units and civilian vehicles. The catastrophic sinking of Dara off the coast of Dubai in 1961 is thought to have been caused by such a land mine. The Omani office in Cairo later denied any involvement in the sinking of Dara. The SAF lacked the numbers to prevent this infiltration. A paramilitary force, the Oman Gendarmerie was formed in 1960 to assist the SAF in this task, and also to take over normal policing duties. The land mine campaign eventually dwindled away.

The air bases at Salalah and Masirah Island remained under British control until 1977 and British commanders continued to lead the Sultanate's armed forces until the late 1990s.

== Gallery ==
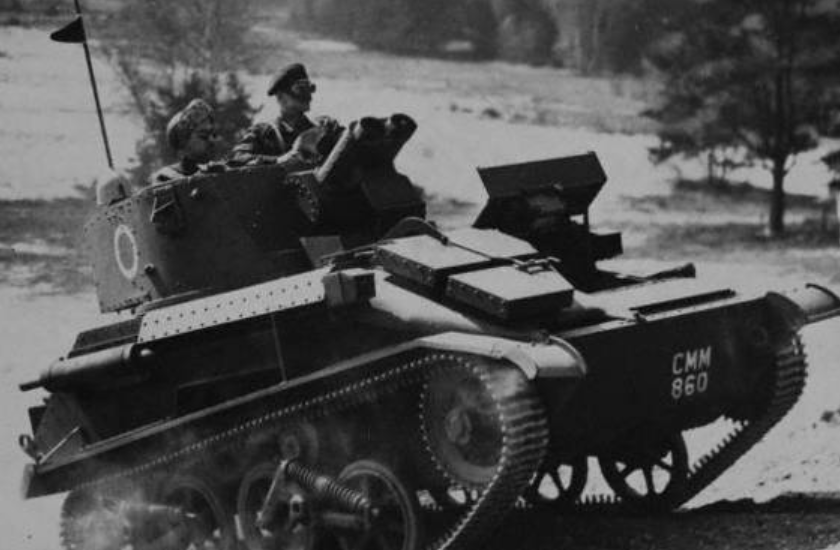
The Sultan of Muscat, Said bin Taimur, watches British troop maneuvers at Aldershot, England, in 1938 prior to the war.

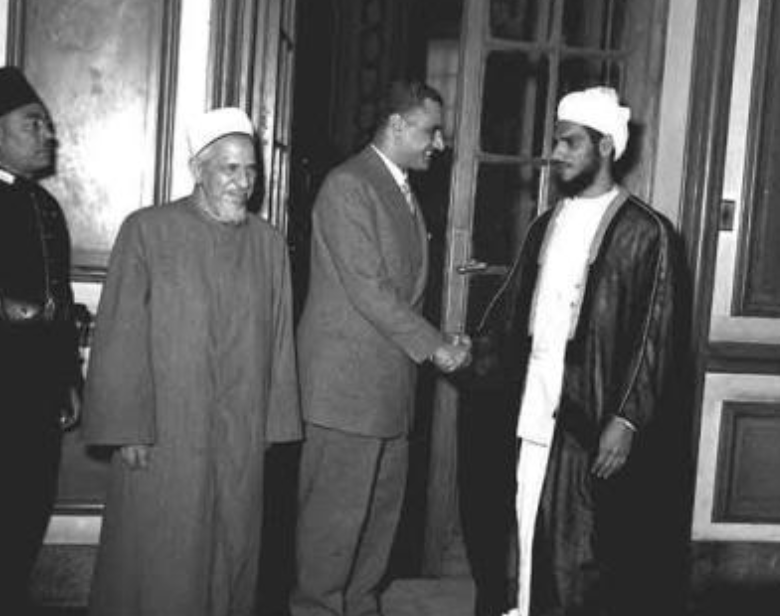
Talib Alhinai (right) and Egypt's President Gamal Abdel Nasser (left) shaking hands in Cairo

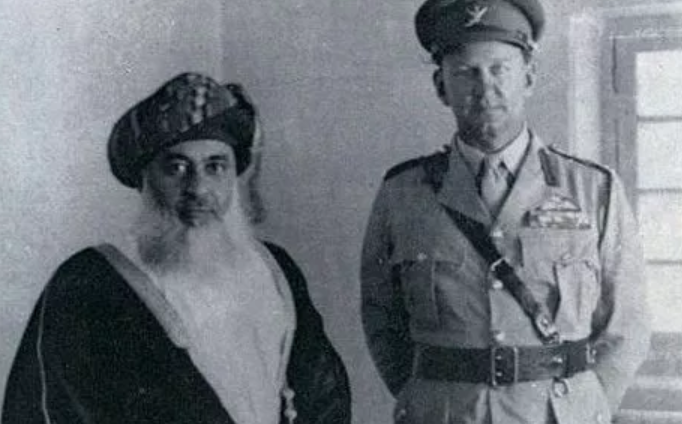
Sultan Said bin Taimur of Muscat and Colonel David Smiley of the British Army

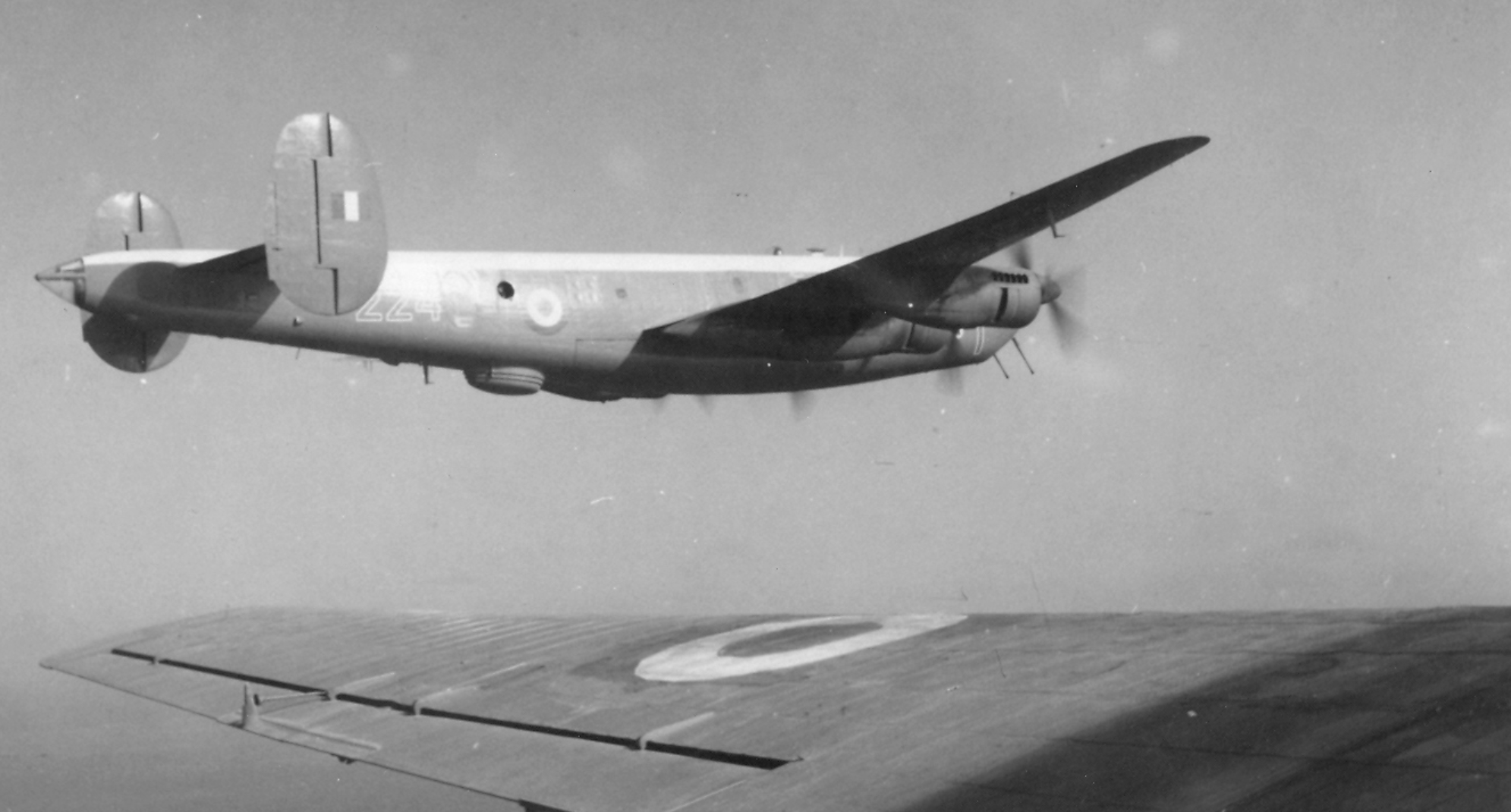
Shackleton of 224 Squadron flying in formation near Masirah Airbase during the Jebel Akhdar campaign

== See also ==
- List of rulers of Oman
- List of modern conflicts in the Middle East
