= Muscat and Oman =

Arab state from 1856 to 1970

Sultanate of Muscat and Oman سلطنة مسقط وعُمان (Arabic) Salṭanat Masqaṭ wa-‘Umān
- 1856–1970
- Flag National emblem

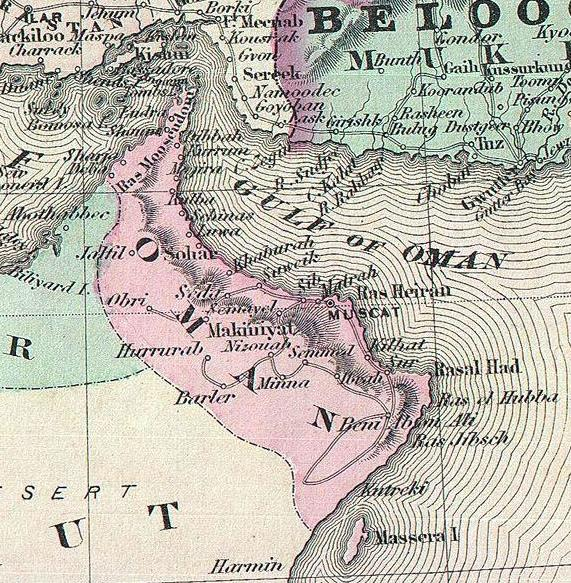
- The Sultanate of Muscat and Oman in 1870
- Status: De jure sovereign state (1856–1970); De facto British protected state (1891–1970)
- Capital: Muscat
- Official languages: Arabic
- Common languages: Omani Arabic; Balochi; Persian; Ottoman Turkish; English
- Religion: Islam (official)
- Government: Absolute monarchy
- Sultan
  - 1855–1866 (first): Thuwaini bin Said
  - 1866–1868: Salim bin Thuwaini
  - 1868–1871: Azzan bin Qais
  - 1871–1888: Turki bin Said
  - 1888–1913: Faisal bin Turki
  - 1913–1932: Taimur bin Faisal
  - 1932–1970: Said bin Taimur
  - 1970 (last): Qaboos bin Said
- History
  - Partition from Zanzibar: 1856
  - Treaty of Seeb: 25 September 1920
  - Jebel Akhdar War: 1954
  - Dhofar Rebellion: 1962
  - Deposition of Said bin Taimur: 23 July 1970
  - Qaboos declares the Sultanate of Oman: 9 August 1970
- Currency: Omani dirham (1856–1892); Indian rupee (1892–1959); Gulf rupee (1959–1970); Saudi riyal (1970)
| Preceded by | Succeeded by |
| Omani Empire | Oman; Liberated Areas |
- Today part of: Oman; United Arab Emirates; Pakistan; Iran

Muscat and Oman (Arabic: مسقط و عُمان), officially known as the Sultanate of Muscat and Oman (Arabic: سلطنة مسقط وعُمان, romanized: Salṭanat Masqaṭ wa-‘Umān), also known briefly as the State of Muscat and Oman (Arabic: دولة مسقط وعُمان, romanized: Dawlat Masqaṭ wa-‘Umān) during the rule of Taimur bin Faisal, was a state that was under de facto British protection which existed in the second half of the 19th century and 20th century. It encompassed the present-day Sultanate of Oman and parts of present-day United Arab Emirates and Pakistan.

In 1856, upon the death of the last ruler of the Omani Empire, Said bin Sultan, the empire split into two separate political entities: the Sultanate of Muscat and Oman and the Sultanate of Zanzibar. The former continued to be led by the Al Busaid dynasty, but transitioned into a new form of government after the palace coup of 23 July 1970 in which the sultan Said bin Taimur was overthrown by the British and his son, Qaboos bin Said, who established the modern-day Sultanate of Oman.

== Name ==
In medieval and early modern times, the area of southeastern Arabia was divided into 4 regions: Oman, Muscat, Dhofar, and the Pirate Coast.

Strictly speaking, Oman (Imamate of Oman, Arabic: عُمان الوسطى, ʿUmān al-Wusṭā) is the inner, continental part of the region without access to the coast and with the capital in the cities of Nizwa and Rustaq. Muscat is the coastal region looking onto the Gulf of Oman. Its rulers often carried out expansion, including overseas. Historical Muscat and Oman are separated by the Green Mountain plateau (Al Jabal Al Akhdar (Arabic: الجبل الأخضر)).

The third region is the so-called "Pirate Coast", later known as Treaty Oman (in reference to their allegiance to the United Kingdom), and is today the United Arab Emirates (UAE).

The fourth is Dhofar, an area south of the Rub' al-khali, east of the Hadhramaut mountains and west of the Hajar mountain ranges. Linguistically part of South Arabia, its inhabitants traditionally speak Modern South Arabian languages. Today it is made up of the Dhofar and the southern districts of Al-Wusta governorates of Oman.

== Background ==
Although there was a Portuguese presence in the region, the Yaruba imams expelled them in the 17th century. The imams later expanded their own maritime empire to the Persian Gulf and Zanzibar, expelling the Portuguese from the wider region, before falling to the Persians. Persian hegemony in Muscat and Oman was ended in 1749 by a defeat at the hands of the elected Imam Ahmad bin Said. The British Empire was keen to dominate southeast Arabia to curb the influence of other European powers and to weaken the Omani Empire in the 18th century. The British empire thus backed the Albusaidi Sultans of Muscat that came to power in the second half of the 18th century. The British empire established a series of treaties with the Sultans with the objective of increasing British political and economic influence over Muscat. The Sultanate eventually became increasingly dependent on British loans and political advice.

Historical differences always existed between the rich, seafaring coastal Sultanate of Muscat and the tribes of the interior. Though the inland territories were under nominal control of the Sultans of Muscat, they were in practice run by tribal leaders and the Imams of Oman, practitioners of the Ibadi sect of Islam.

The Sultanate of Muscat possessed a powerful naval force, which enabled the creation of a maritime empire dating from the expulsion of the Portuguese in 1650 through the 19th century, at times encompassing modern Oman, the United Arab Emirates, southern Balochistan, and Zanzibar and the adjacent coasts of Kenya, Tanzania and Mozambique. The Sultanate of Muscat also engaged in a very lucrative slave trade across east Africa.

Oman was ruled by semi-hereditary Imams of the Yarubid dynasty, who were able to expel the Portuguese and unite the second region of Muscat, which was ruled by Sultans, and thus found the Omani Empire. The Omani Empire changed dynasties in favour of the Busaids in 1749, yet the empire fractured following the death of the fifth Busaid leader in 1856 leading to the creation of two new Sultanates: the Sultanate of Muscat and Oman and the Sultanate of Zanzibar, both of which would be ended by a coup in the 20th century.

== Consolidation and decline ==
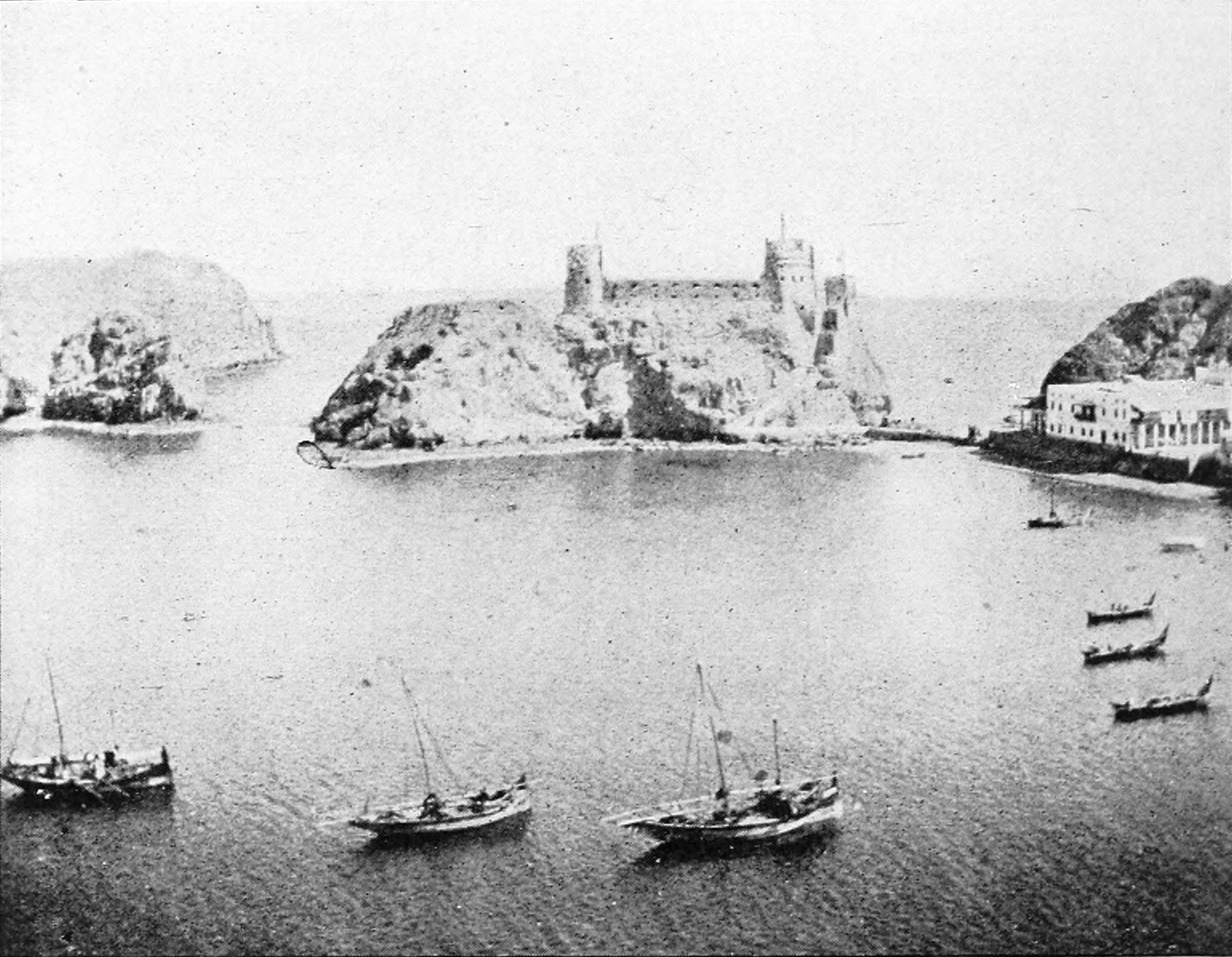
Muscat harbour in 1903

In the early 1820s, the Sultanate lost most of its territories in the Persian Gulf, which became the Trucial States under British protection. The fifth Sultan of the Al Said dynasty, Said bin Sultan, consolidated the Sultanate's territorial holdings and economic interests and Oman prospered. However, the Omani fleet was unable to compete with the more technically advanced European fleets and the Sultanate lost much of the trade with South Asia. Pressure by the British to abandon the slave trade further led to the loss of political and economic clout of the Sultanate.

On 4 June 1856, Said bin Sultan died without appointing an heir to the throne and members of the Al Said dynasty could not agree on a ruler. Through British mediation, two rulers were appointed from the Al Said clan; the third son of the Sultan, Thuwaini bin Said became ruler of the mainland. His sixth son, Majid bin Said, became ruler of an independent Sultanate of Zanzibar on 19 October 1856. The Sultans of Zanzibar were thereafter obliged to pay an annual tribute to Muscat.

The Imamate cause was renewed in the interior of Oman due to the development of British imperialism in the coastal Oman, the Sultanate of Muscat. In 1913, a rebellion was led by Imam Salim Alkharusi against Muscat to reestablish an Imamate in the interior region of Oman. The Imamate, similar to the Sultanate, was ruled by the Ibadi sect, however, the dispute between both parties was for the most part political. The Omanis in the interior believed that the ruler should be elected and rejected British control over the Sultanate. The Sultanate was however able to defend itself with British help. This historical split continued throughout much of the twentieth century with Sultan Taimur bin Faisal granting limited autonomy to the Imamate of Oman under the Ibadi clergy through the Treaty of Seeb in 1920.

The last overseas possession, the port of Gwadar across the Gulf of Oman, was sold to Pakistan in 1958. However, the sultanate did gain some territory in 1967, when Britain returned the Khuriya Muriya Islands (originally granted as a gift from the sultan to Queen Victoria in 1854).

== Insurgency and oil drilling ==
The discovery of oil in the Persian Gulf exacerbated the dispute between the Sultan in Muscat and the Imams of Oman. Oil exploration had begun in the early 1920s by the Anglo-Persian Oil Company. The course of World War II severely disrupted such activities. Further, the Sultanate of Muscat during that time was experiencing terrible social, economic and political conditions. The Sultanate was underdeveloped with no infrastructure or telephones, and Sultan Said bin Taimur prohibited anything that he considered "decadent", including radios. The British government continued to have vast political control over the Sultanate as the chief adviser to the Sultan, defense secretary and all ministers of the Sultanate except for two were British. The British government, Iraq Petroleum Company and the Sultan were keen to search for oil and made early plans (1946) to establish an army that could occupy the Imamate of Oman.

The last Imam of Oman, Ghalib Bin Ali, started an uprising in 1954 when the Sultan granted licenses to the Iraq Petroleum Company despite the fact that the largest oil fields lay inside the Imamate. The hostilities were put down in 1955, but the longer conflict would evolve into the Jebel Akhdar rebellion, where Sultan Said bin Taimur relied heavily on continued British military support. Iraq Petroleum, along with its operator of oil exploration, Petroleum Development Oman, was owned by European oil giants including Anglo-Iranian Oil's successor BP which encouraged the British government to extend their support to the Sultan.

The insurgency erupted again in 1957, when Saudi Arabia began supporting the Omani rebels, but eventually the Sultan was able to establish pre-eminence over most of the inland. The same year, British forces bombarded the town of Nizwa, the capital of the Imamate, and toppled the Ibadi theocracy. Ghalib Bin Ali went into exile in Saudi Arabia and the last rebel forces were defeated two years later, in 1959. The Treaty of Seeb was terminated and the autonomous Imamate of Oman abolished.

The frequency of uprisings such as the Dhofar Rebellion, supported by the communist government of South Yemen, motivated the British to supplant the Sultan. The British chose the Western-educated son of the Sultan, Qaboos bin Said who was locked up in the palace, because his father feared a coup. On his release, Qaboos bin Said, with the help of British military forces, staged a successful palace coup and was proclaimed Sultan of Muscat and Oman in 1970. The newly consolidated territories along with Muscat were reorganized into the present-day unified Sultanate of Oman by August 1970.

=== Sohar Sultanate ===
The Sohar Sultanate lasted from 1920 until about 1932. In 1920, Sheik Ali Banu Bu Ali, a relative of Sultan Taimur bin Faisal, rebelled in the northern town of Sohar and proclaimed himself Sultan but was deposed by the British in 1932.

== See also ==
- History of Oman
- List of rulers of Oman
- List of British representatives in Muscat and Oman
- Muscat
- Imamate of Oman
- Provinces of Oman
- Gwadar
