= Tanam, Oman =

Tanam
- Village
- Location in Oman
- Coordinates: 23°09′N 56°28′E
- Country: Oman
- Region: Ad Dhahirah Region
- Time zone: UTC+4 (Oman Standard Time)

Tanam or Tan`am is a village in Ad Dhahirah Region, in northeastern Oman. The village lies just southwest of the town of Ibri in Wadi Aswad. The village is described as "little more than an oasis surrounded by block house" It is an important centre for date production and contains a notable population of Duru peoples, especially since the 1970s, when the gather during the date harvest but then return to their nomadic life." The village contains Tanam Hospital, a 200-bed hospital. The hamlet of Dubayshi lies to the north and the hamlet of Khuldah immediately west.
