= Imamate of Oman =

Historical region in eastern and central Oman

Imamate State of Oman دولة إمامة عُمان (Arabic) Imāmat 'Umān
- 749–1959
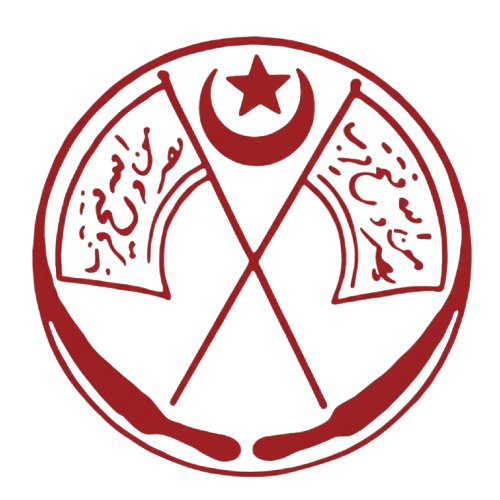
- Flag Emblem
- Motto: نصرٌ من الله وفتحٌ قريب; Naṣrun min Allāh wafatḥun qarīb "Victory from God and an imminent triumph"
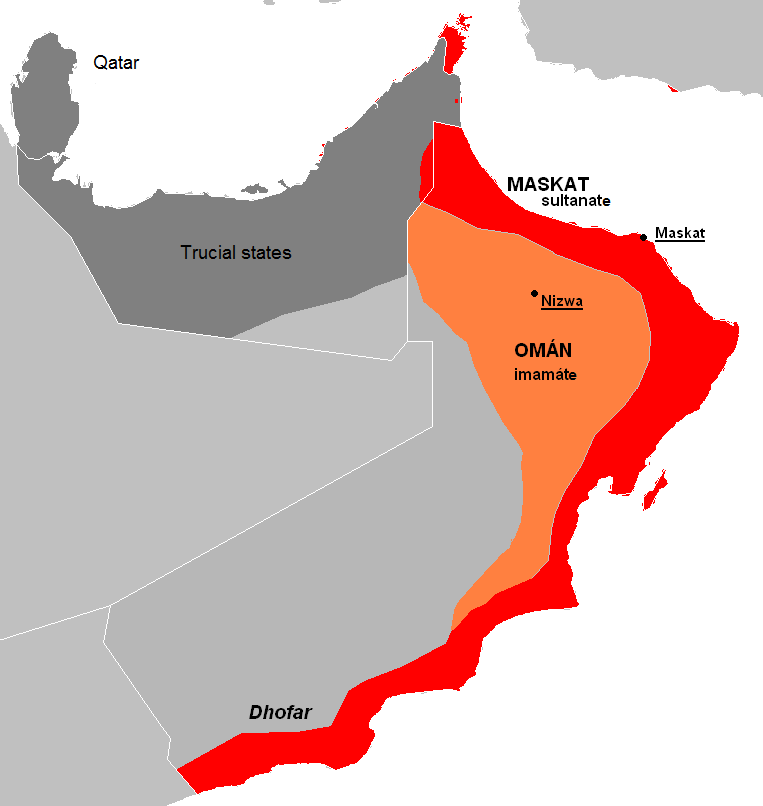
- The last iteration of the Imamate of Oman (Orange) and Muscat and Oman (red) in the 20th century
- Status: Imamate
- Capital: Nizwa; 22°56′N 57°32′E
- Common languages: Arabic
- Religion: Ibadi Islam (state religion)
- Government: Islamic elective monarchy
- Imam
  - 749–751 (first): Al-Julanda bin Masud
  - 1954–1959 (last): Ghalib al-Hinai
- Legislature: Consultative Council
- Historical era: Dissolution of the Ottoman Empire/New Imperialism
  - Imamate declared: 749
  - Treaty of Seeb: 25 September 1920
  - End of the Jebel Akhdar War: 1959
- Currency: Maria Theresa thaler
- ISO 3166 code: OM
| Preceded by | Succeeded by |
| Umayyad Caliphate | Omani Empire; Muscat and Oman |
- Today part of: Oman

The Imamate of Oman (Arabic: إِمَامَة عُمَان, romanised: Imāmat ʿUmān), officially the Imamate State of Oman (Arabic: دولة إمامة عُمان), was several succession of states within the Oman proper (Arabic: عُمَان ٱلْوُسْطَى, romanised: ʿUmān al-Wusṭā, lit. 'Central Oman') in the Hajar Mountains, part of the present-day Sultanate of Oman. The capital of the Imamate alternated historically between Rustaq and Nizwa. The Imamate's territory extended north to Ibri and south to the Alsharqiyah region and the Sharqiya Sands. The Imamate was bounded in the east by the Hajar Mountains and in the west by the Rub' al Khali (Empty Quarter) desert. The Al Hajar Mountains separated the Imamate of Oman from Muscat and Oman. The elected Imam (ruler) resided in the capital, and Walis (governors) represented the Imamate in its different regions.

== History ==
Omani Azd used to travel to Basra for trade. Omani Azd were granted a section of Basra, where they could settle and attend their needs. Many of the Azd who settled in Basra became wealthy merchants and under their leader Muhallab bin Abi Sufrah started to expand the influence of power east towards Khorasan. Ibadi Islam originated in Basra with its founder Abdullah ibn Ibada around the year 650 CE, which the Azd in Iraq followed. Later, al-Hajjaj ibn Yusuf, the Umayyad governor of Iraq, came into conflict with the Ibadis, which forced them out to Oman. Among those who returned to Oman was the scholar Jabir ibn Zayd, an Omani Azdi. His return and the return of many other scholars greatly enhanced the Ibadi movement in Oman. The Imamate is estimated to have been established in 750 CE, shortly after the fall of the Umayyads.

Since its appearance, the Imamate governed parts or the whole of present-day Oman and overseas lands for interrupted periods of time. At its peak, the Imamate was able to expel the Portuguese colonizers from Oman and establish a sea power that extended its empire to the Persian Gulf and East Africa during the 17th century. Even though the Imamate was isolated by the Al Hajar Mountains and the Rub' al Khali desert, it had extensive global trade, as it exported dried dates, limes and handmade cotton textiles, and imported other products. The majority of trade happened with the Indian subcontinent.

In the mid-18th century, Ahmed bin Sa'id Al Bu Said, who came from a small village in the interior of Oman, expelled the Persian colonisers from Oman and became the elected Imam of Oman, with Rustaq as its capital. Upon his death in 1783, the sovereignty of Oman was divided between the coastal side, which followed a hereditary line of succession ruled by Albusaidi Sultans in Muscat, and the interior of Oman, which retained the elective Imamate and later moved its capital from Rustaq to Nizwa.

The British Empire was keen to dominate southeast Arabia to stifle the growing dominance of other European powers and counter the emerging maritime strength of the Omani Empire during the 18th and 19th centuries. The British thus made the decision to back the Albusaidi Sultans of Muscat. The British Empire established a series of treaties with the Sultans with the objective of advancing British political and economic interests in Muscat, in return for granting protection to the Sultans. The Sultanate eventually became increasingly dependent on British loans and political advice.

There were often tensions between the imams and the sultans of Muscat. The dispute between the Imamate and the Sultanate was for the most part political. The Omanis in the interior believed that the ruler should be elected and rejected growing British political and economic control over Muscat and Oman.

In 1913, Imam Salim ibn Rashid al-Kharusi instigated an anti-Muscat rebellion that lasted until 1920 when the Imamate established peace with the Sultanate through the signing of Treaty of Seeb. The treaty resulted in a de facto split between Oman and Muscat, wherein the interior part (Oman) was ruled by the Imamate and the coastal part (Muscat) was ruled by the Sultanate.

Iraq Petroleum Company, which signed an oil concession with the Sultan of Muscat in 1937, deduced that oil was very likely to exist in the interior regions of Oman. In 1954, a new imam, Ghalib Alhinai, defended the Imamate from the attacks of the Sultanate of Muscat, which was backed by the British government. Sultan Said Bin Taimur of Muscat, with the direct support from the British forces, was able to defeat the Imamate in Jebel Akhdar War that lasted until 1959. The name Muscat and Oman was changed to the Sultanate of Oman in 1970.

In current usage, "Oman proper" can also refer to the whole of the present-day sultanate minus the exclaves of Musandam and Madha.

=== Phases ===
There are eight phases in the history of the Imamate of Oman:

- First Imamate (749–751)
- Second Imamate (793–893)
- Third Imamate (897–940s)
- Fourth Imamate (1016–1164)
- Fifth Imamate (1406–1556)
- Sixth Imamate (1624–1792)
- Seventh Imamate (1868–1871)
- Eighth Imamate (1913–1959)

== Governance ==
The Imamate of Oman, similar to the Sultanate of Muscat, was ruled by the Ibadi sect. Imams exercised spiritual and temporal representation over the region.

The Imamate was a 1,200-year-old system of government pioneered by the Ibadi religious leaders of Oman, and was based upon the Islamic sharia. The Imamate holds that the ruler should be elected. The imam is considered as the head of the community but tribalism that is part of the Omani society encouraged a decentralised form of governance that would help sustain political unity among the Omanis. The Imamate set out a government system wherein the ruler should not have absolute political nor military power; rather power should be shared with local governors. To prevent local or external threats to the Imamate, the imam had to gather the support of the local communities and tribes to raise a force to fight for a certain cause. The Imam needed an in-depth understanding of tribal politics and political acumen to maintain political stability within the Imamate when conflicts occurred.

== See also ==
- History of Oman
- List of rulers of Oman
