= Nizwa =

City in Ad Dakhiliyah, Oman

Nizwa Nizwā (نِزْوَى)
- City
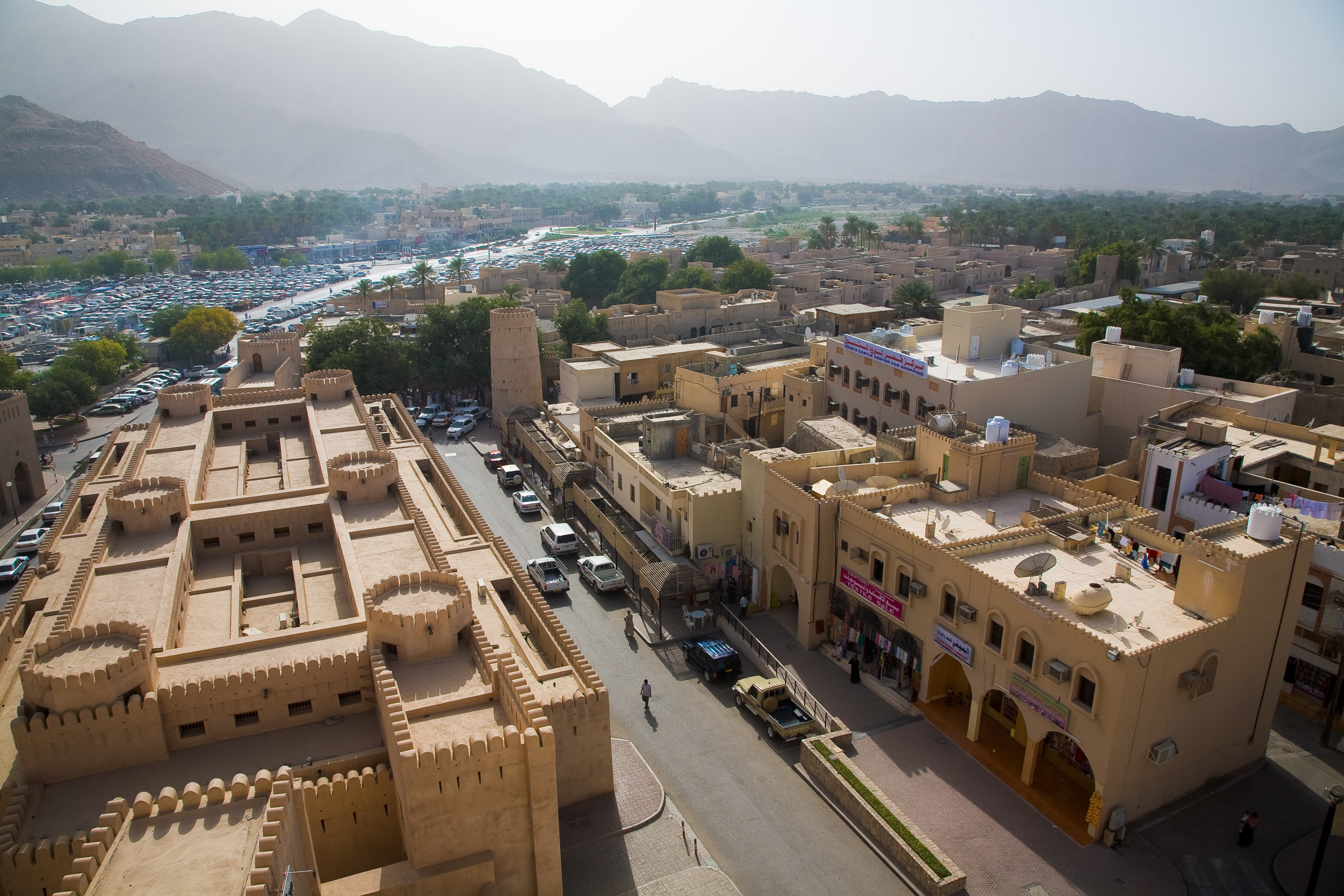
- Nizwa in March 2008

- Location of Nizwa in Oman Nizwa (Middle East) Nizwa (West and Central Asia)
- Coordinates: 22°56′N 57°32′E
- Country: Oman
- Governorate: Ad Dakhiliyah Governorate

Government
  - Type: Absolute monarchy
  - Sultan: Haitham bin Tariq Al Said

Area
  - Metro: 3,500 km^{2} (1,400 sq mi)
- Elevation: 492 m (1,614 ft)

Population (2008)
  - Metro: 120,000
- Time zone: UTC+4 (Oman standard time)

Nizwa (Arabic: نِزْوَى, romanized: Nizwā) is the largest city in Ad Dakhiliyah Governorate in Oman and was the capital of Oman proper. Nizwa is about 140 km (87 miles) (1.5 hour drive) from the Omani capital Muscat. The population is estimated at around 83,544 people.

Nizwa is one of the oldest cities in Oman, and was once a center of trade, religion, education and art. Its Jama (grand mosque) was formerly a center for Islamic learning. Nizwa acquired its importance because it has been an important meeting point at the base of the Western Hajar Mountains. Set amid a verdant spread of date palms, it is strategically located at the crossroads of routes linking the interior with Muscat and the lower reaches of Dhofar, thus serving as the link for a large part of the country. Today, Nizwa is a diverse prosperous place with numerous agricultural, historical and recreational aspects. Nizwa is a center for date growing and is the market place for the area.

== Etymology ==
Historians cannot agree on the origins of the name of the city. Some suggest the name was derived from the Arabic verb (Arabic: انزوا) which means being alone. Others say that the city was named after an old water spring.

== History ==
Nizwa was the capital of Oman in the 6th and 7th centuries AD. With its deep connection to the root of Islam, Nizwa possesses a number of renowned mosques, such as Sultan Qaboos Jama (Friday mosque), So'al Mosque built in the 2nd century AH (9th century AD), Ash-Shawathinah Mosque in Uqr and Ash-Sharja Mosque. There are also Al-Ain Mosque, Ash-Sheikh Mosque and Shuraij Mosque in Tanuf built in 377 AH (around 1000 AD).

A handwritten letter from the Islamic Prophet Muhammad in 630 asked the locals of the mountain town of Nizwa to convert. The locals then sent a return delegation to Medina and embraced Islam. A tutor was sent by Muhammad to teach the new Muslims of Nizwa the fundamentals of the religion.

The explorer Ibn Battuta visited in the 14th century, noting Nizwa as "a city at the foot of a mountain, enveloped by orchards and streams, and with fine bazaars and splendid clean mosques."

In the early 1950s, the large round tower of the ancient fort built in the center of the town was bombed and rocketed by the British Royal Air Force, who were called in to assist the then-reigning Sultan Said bin Taimur in suppressing a revolt by leaders of the interior Imamate of Oman. The conflict was driven by a struggle for a share of Oman's newly discovered oil wealth.

Nizwa has become a more modern city since 1970 under the reign of Sultan Qaboos. Improvements include connections to Muscat via a two-lane highway, which has increased tourism. Communications have been improved to include broadband access, and the city is home to a substantial hospital. It is also a hub for education including a technical college, College of Applied Sciences, The University of Nizwa, and the training academy for the Royal Oman Police. There are now many hotels and tourism is promoted in the area.

== Geography and climate ==
Mountains surround Nizwa on every side and there is outstanding mountain scenery close by. Nizwa has an arid climate under the Köppen climate classification. In the winter from November until March the climate is pleasant, with temperatures as low as 12 degrees Celsius in January. In the summer, the climate is hot and dry with temperatures reaching 45 degrees Celsius in July.

Climate data for Nizwa, elevation 462 m (1,516 ft), (1991–2020 normals, extremes 2003–2023)
Month	Jan	Feb	Mar	Apr	May	Jun	Jul	Aug	Sep	Oct	Nov	Dec	Year
Record high °C (°F)	32.1 (89.8)	35.2 (95.4)	40.8 (105.4)	41.8 (107.2)	48.1 (118.6)	49.1 (120.4)	49.4 (120.9)	47.2 (117.0)	45.6 (114.1)	41.6 (106.9)	36.8 (98.2)	34.2 (93.6)	49.4 (120.9)
Mean daily maximum °C (°F)	26.1 (79.0)	28.8 (83.8)	32.8 (91.0)	37.3 (99.1)	41.1 (106.0)	43.3 (109.9)	42.9 (109.2)	42.0 (107.6)	39.8 (103.6)	36.5 (97.7)	31.4 (88.5)	27.9 (82.2)	35.8 (96.5)
Daily mean °C (°F)	19.6 (67.3)	21.9 (71.4)	25.7 (78.3)	30.5 (86.9)	34.2 (93.6)	35.8 (96.4)	35.6 (96.1)	34.2 (93.6)	32.4 (90.3)	29.5 (85.1)	25.0 (77.0)	21.1 (70.0)	28.8 (83.8)
Mean daily minimum °C (°F)	12.4 (54.3)	14.3 (57.7)	17.6 (63.7)	22.4 (72.3)	26.1 (79.0)	28.0 (82.4)	28.4 (83.1)	27.3 (81.1)	25.1 (77.2)	21.5 (70.7)	17.9 (64.2)	14.0 (57.2)	21.3 (70.2)
Record low °C (°F)	5.2 (41.4)	4.6 (40.3)	9.7 (49.5)	15.9 (60.6)	18.4 (65.1)	23.7 (74.7)	23.3 (73.9)	22.6 (72.7)	19.2 (66.6)	14.8 (58.6)	12.5 (54.5)	7.1 (44.8)	4.6 (40.3)
Average precipitation mm (inches)	0.7 (0.03)	5.7 (0.22)	9.4 (0.37)	15.2 (0.60)	1.9 (0.07)	10.9 (0.43)	6.6 (0.26)	8.0 (0.31)	3.5 (0.14)	5.9 (0.23)	1.7 (0.07)	3.8 (0.15)	73.3 (2.88)
Average precipitation days (≥ 1.0 mm)	0.6	0.5	0.6	1.2	0.9	1.3	1.1	2.5	1.3	0.8	0.5	0.4	11.7
Source 1: World Meteorological Organization (precipitation 1999–2009)
Source 2: Starlings Roost Weather

== Attractions ==
The main tourist attractions in the city are Nizwa Fort, the traditional souq or market, and the Falaj Daris irrigation system, which was named a UNESCO World Heritage Site in 2006. In the 1990s, the mosque, fort, and souq, which are located next to each other in the city centre, were renovated using traditional materials. In 1993, Nizwa won the award of 'Organisation of Arab Cities'.

=== Nizwa Fort ===
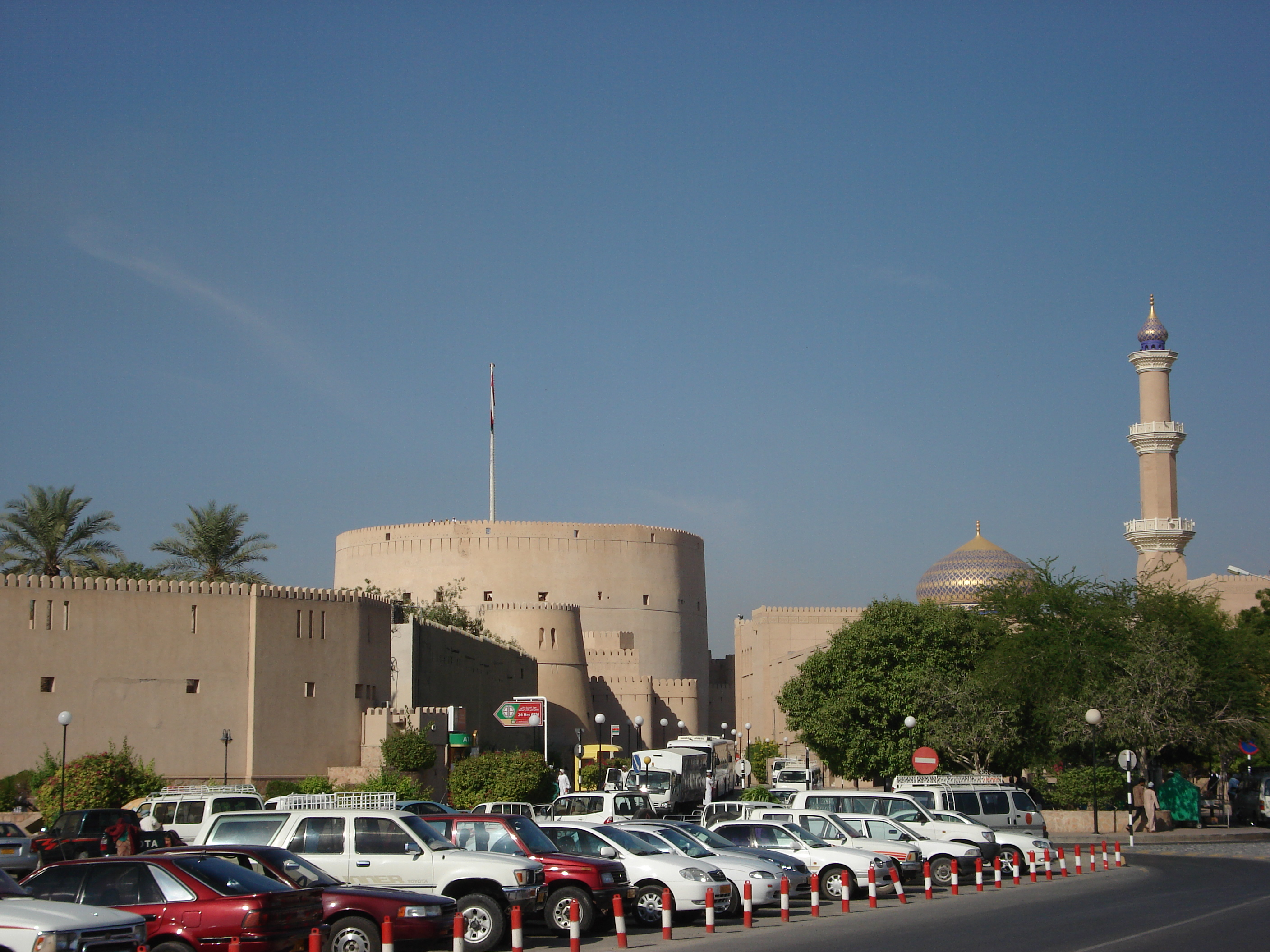
Nizwa's fort

Nizwa Fort was built in 1668 AD by Imam Sultan Bin Saif Al Ya'rubi, and today is Oman's most visited national monument. The fort was the administrative seat of authority for the presiding imams and walis in times of peace and conflict. The main bulk of the fort took about 12 years to complete and was built above an underground stream. The fort is a reminder of the town's significance through turbulent periods in Oman's long history. It was a formidable stronghold against raiding forces that desired Nizwa's abundant natural wealth and its strategic crossroads location.

=== Nizwa Souq ===
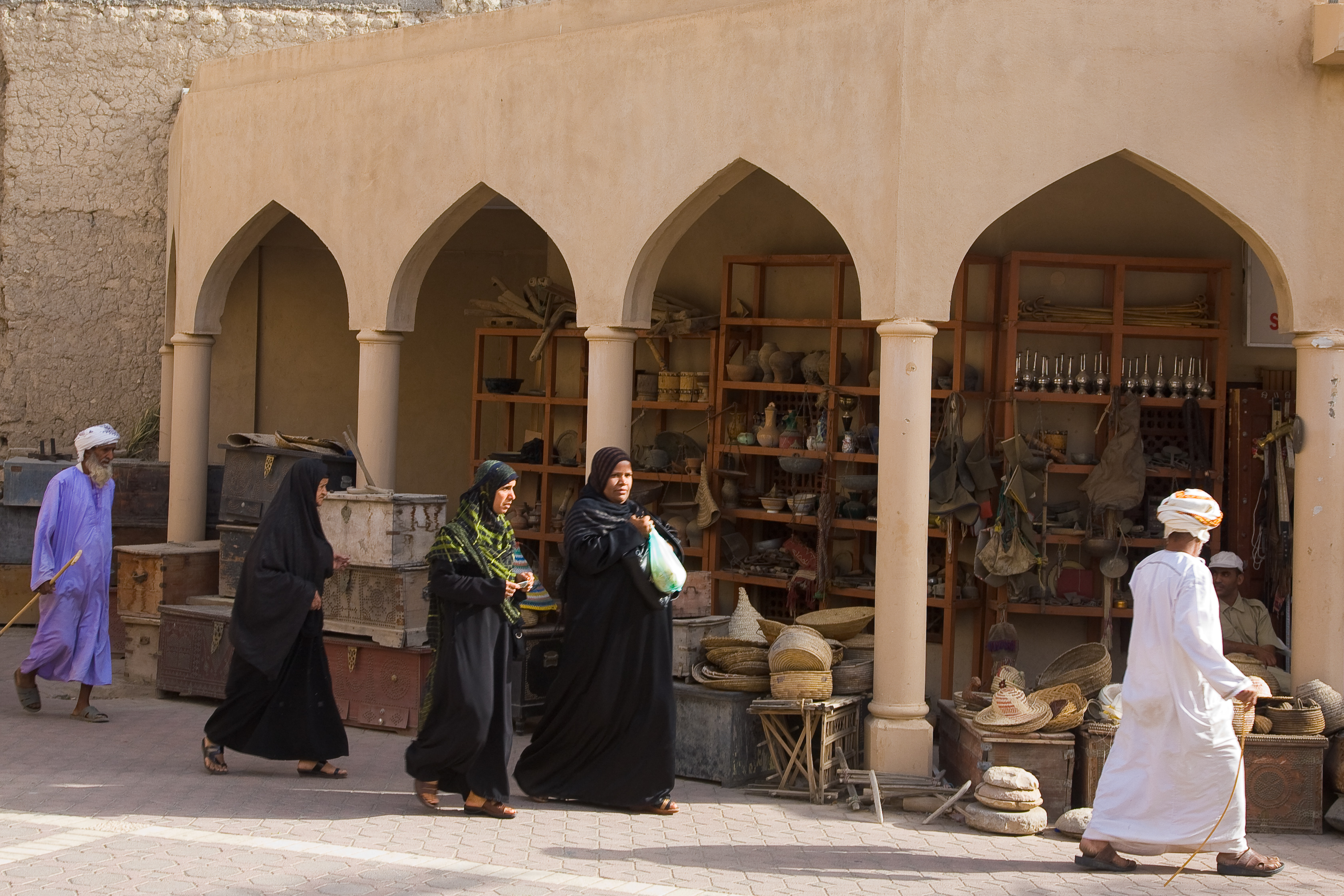
Nizwa souk

The city, famous for its handicrafts and agricultural products, has an expansive souq with an array of products. It is one of the most important in the country besides Muttrah. The souq bustles with vendors selling everything from meat, fish, fruits and vegetables to spices, dates, gold and silverware. Nizwa is renowned for its silver jewelry which is considered to be the best in the country. Its people are masters in making khanjars (curved daggers), recognized for their distinctive style and patterns. They also make copperware, coffee pots, swords, leather goods and pottery.

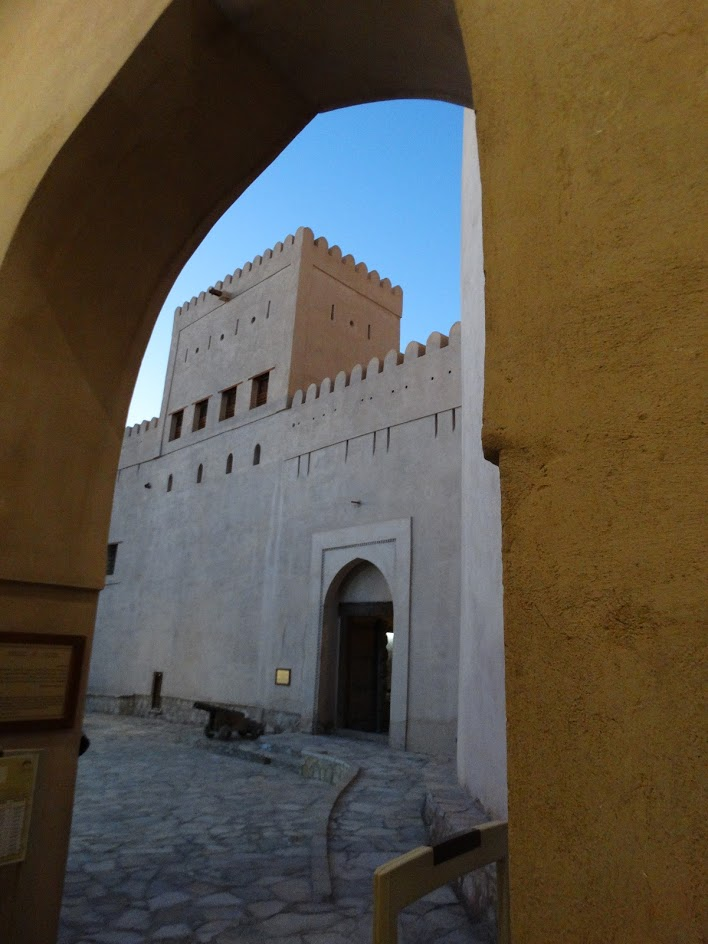
Nizwa fort

=== Falaj Daris ===
Falaj Daris, a UNESCO World Heritage Site, is the largest falaj, or irrigation system, in Oman. It provides the surrounding countryside with much-needed water for farming. Al Ghantuq and Dhoot are two other important irrigation systems in Nizwa. Farming is widely practiced and the town's immense palm farms stretch for eight kilometers along the course of two wadis, Kalbouh and Al Abiad.

== Economy ==
Historically, Nizwa was known for producing mats from straw. As of 1920, the city was described as having a "thriving" metalworking industry.

== Education ==
- University of Nizwa
- University of Technology and Applied Sciences

== Transportation ==
A short drive from Nizwa centre is the old village of Tanuf, known for its seasonal waterfalls. Waterfalls in Tanuf are unique to the area within the steep mountain sides and the water reservoir.

Nizwa is connected to the U.A.E. city of Al Ain by road, via the Mezyad border post. This road also goes past the Provinces of Ibri and Dhank.

== Notable people ==
- Ahmed Al-Harrasi, scientist and a professor of organic chemistry at University of Nizwa
- Arshad Al-Alawi, professional footballer
- Alkhattab Alhinai, Deputy Chairman of Oman State Council
- Bal'arab bin Himyar, Imam from the Yaruba dynasty

== See also ==
- List of cities in Oman
