= Operation Simba =

1972–75 Omani operation of the Dhofar Rebellioin

- Part of Dhofar Rebellion
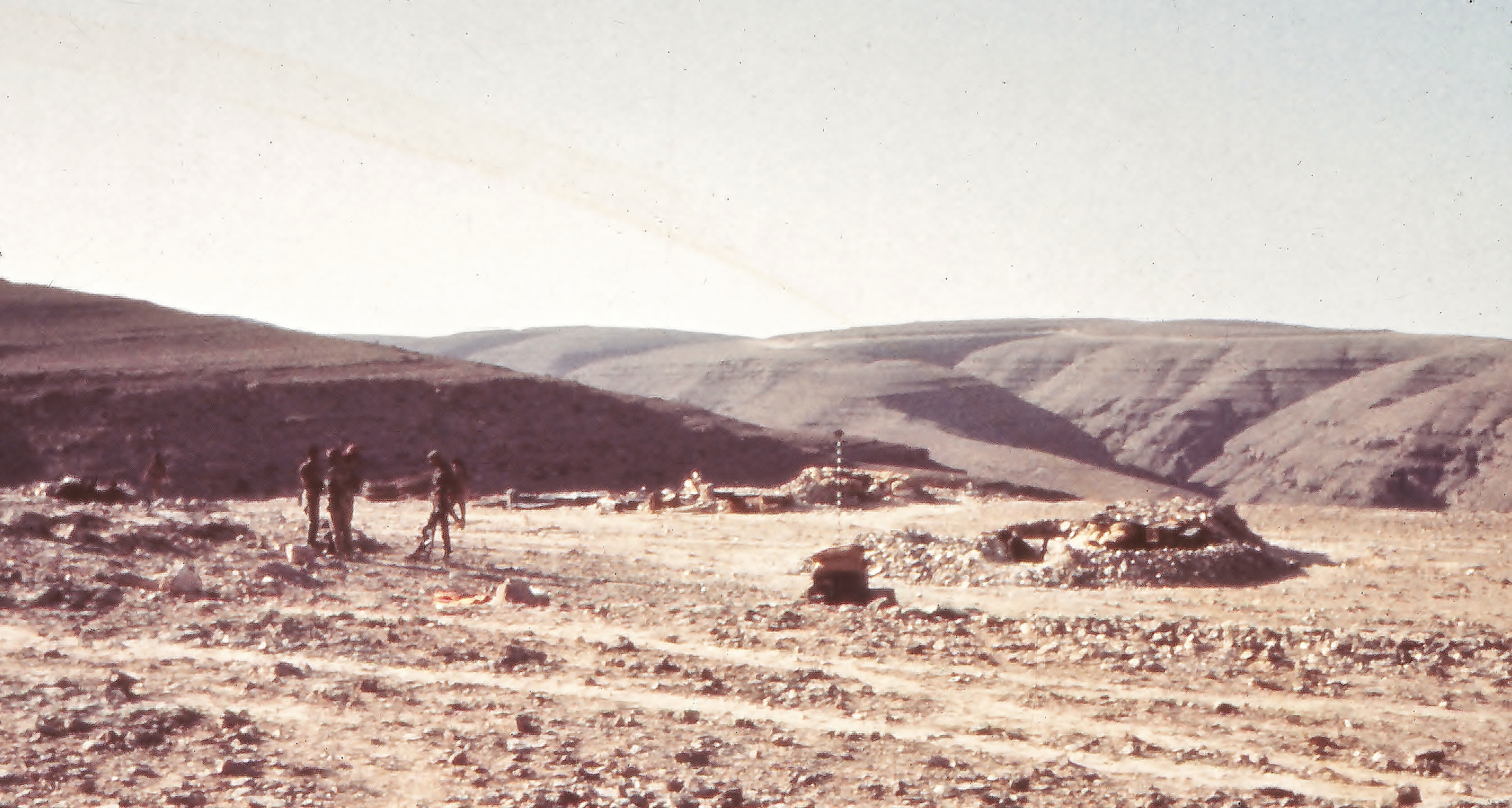
- SAF Sangars on the Sarfait plateau, looking towards the airstrip
Date	17 April 1972 – 11 December 1975
Location	Sarfait, Oman
Result	Omani victory

Belligerents
Sultan of Oman	Popular Front for the Liberation of the Occupied Arabian Gulf

Operation Simba, and the subsequent fighting around high ground near Sarfait, was the longest running conflict of the Dhofar Rebellion. On 17 April 1972, a battalion of the Sultan of Oman's Armed Forces (SAF) landed by helicopter to establish a position on a dominating ridge at Sarfait, near the border with the People's Democratic Republic of Yemen (PDRY). The aim was to interdict the supply lines used by the guerillas of the PFLOAG from the PDRY to the interior of Dhofar, which ran along the narrow coastal plain beneath the foot of the escarpment at the southern end of the ridge.

It was found that the position could not be extended to the coast to block the camel and vehicle tracks running below the escarpment, and lacking water, the position could be maintained only by aircraft or helicopters. The demands placed by the Simba position on the Sultan of Oman's Air Force forced the SAF to curtail other operations in Dhofar and several times threatened the collapse of the position.

After the position had been held for three years, and the overall course of the war turned in favour of the Sultanate of Muscat and Oman, the Simba position became the launching point for an operation which was originally intended as a diversion but succeeded in cutting the rebels' supply line, precipitating their ultimate collapse.

== Background ==
The Dhofar Rebellion began in the mid 1960s. The Dhofar Liberation Front (DLF) sought local autonomy, but after the British Withdrawal from Aden in 1968 and the establishment of the People's Democratic Republic of Yemen, the rebel movement acquired a secure source of supplies and weapons, and became more revolutionary in nature, renaming itself the Popular Front for the Liberation of the Occupied Arabian Gulf (PFLOAG). By 1970, the PFLOAG guerillas dominated the jebel, the mountainous hinterland of Dhofar.

On 23 July that year, the reactionary Sultan Said bin Taimur was deposed by his son, Qaboos bin Said al Said, who immediately instigated social reforms and began a counteroffensive against the guerillas. While locally recruited irregular firqats and two squadrons of the British Special Air Service sought to establish a permanent foothold on the eastern jebel from which civil aid teams could expand the Sultan's authority, the two regular battalions of the Sultan's Armed Forces (SAF) stationed in Dhofar also took a more active role. One of them, the Desert Regiment commanded by Lieutenant Colonel Nigel Knocker, was holding a base at Akoot, on the western jebel. This position was of little tactical significance, and most of the battalion was tied down merely defending it and bringing up supplies, especially water.

== Plan ==
The Sultan's Armed Forces had recently acquired squadrons of transport aircraft and AB-205 helicopters, which made more ambitious moves possible. Knocker and his superiors, Colonel Mike Harvey, commanding the Dhofar Area, and Brigadier John Graham, the overall commander of the Sultan's Armed Forces, were all looking at the area close to the border with the People's Democratic Republic of Yemen. The PFLOAG's supply line ran from Hawf, just inside the PDRY, along vehicle and camel tracks known variously as the "Chinese Road", the "Freedom Road" and the "Ho Chi Minh trail" along the coast before turning north up a wadi to a complex of caves at Shershitti, from where camel trains took the supplies and munitions eastward.

Lieutenant Colonel Knocker intended to seize the high ground at Sarfait, close to the border with the PDRY. The "Freedom Road" was in dead ground at the foot of the escarpment at the south of this ridge, so the Desert Regiment would then capture a sharp rocky peak known as "Capstan" below the escarpment. The plan depended both on being able to construct an airstrip on the ridge and on finding a water source on "Capstan", which some firqats insisted did exist. Despite the uncertainties of the plan and the calculation that it would take most of the SAF's resources to maintain the position, Brigadier Graham judged it was necessary to launch an aggressive operation before Britain's continuing withdrawal from the Middle East left Oman isolated.

== Launch ==
"L Day", the date on which the operation was to be launched, was set for 17 April 1972. In preparation for the operation, all the AB 205 helicopters of No. 3 Squadron of the Sultan's Air Force, flown mainly by serving RAF pilots on loan to Oman or former RAF pilots under contract, were concentrated at Akoot As a preliminary move, sixty men from two companies (No. 2 Company and "Red" Company) (Note: "Red" Company had been detached from the Northern Frontier Regiment in 1966 to create a nucleus around which the Desert Regiment was formed.) of the Desert Regiment and a firqa were flown on "L-1 Day" to a position north of Sarfait from where the regulars moved overnight to seize the intended landing ground.

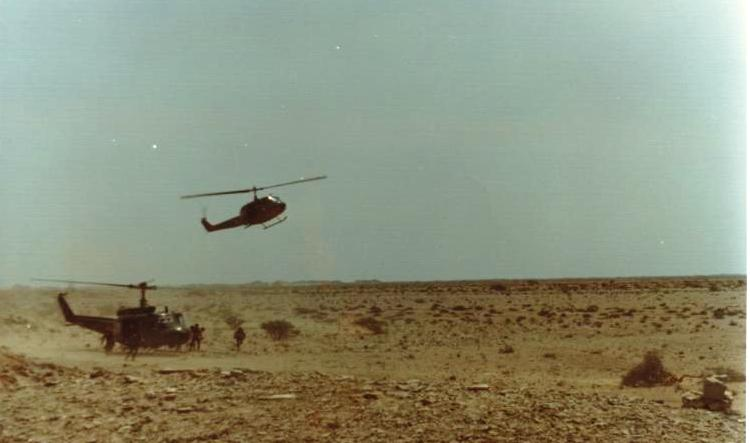
Ab 205 helicopters of the Sultan's Air Force landing troops

17 April opened with bad weather, with a low cloud ceiling which threatened to thwart the operation. However, it lifted enough for the operation to be launched after a delay of two hours. Rather than a massed "air cavalry" assault, pairs of AB 205 helicopters shuttled 100 troops, support weapons, defensive stores (sandbags, barbed wire etc.), ammunition and supplies from Akoot during the day.

The helicopter lift continued over the next two days, during which a rough airstrip was cleared at Simba. The first Short SC.7 Skyvan transport aircraft of No. 2 Squadron of the Sultan's Air Force landed on 19 April. During the following night a violent storm struck much of western Dhofar. The camp at Akoot was partially flooded, and the newly completed position on the exposed high ground at Sarfait was devastated. One soldier was killed by lightning.

== Capstan ==
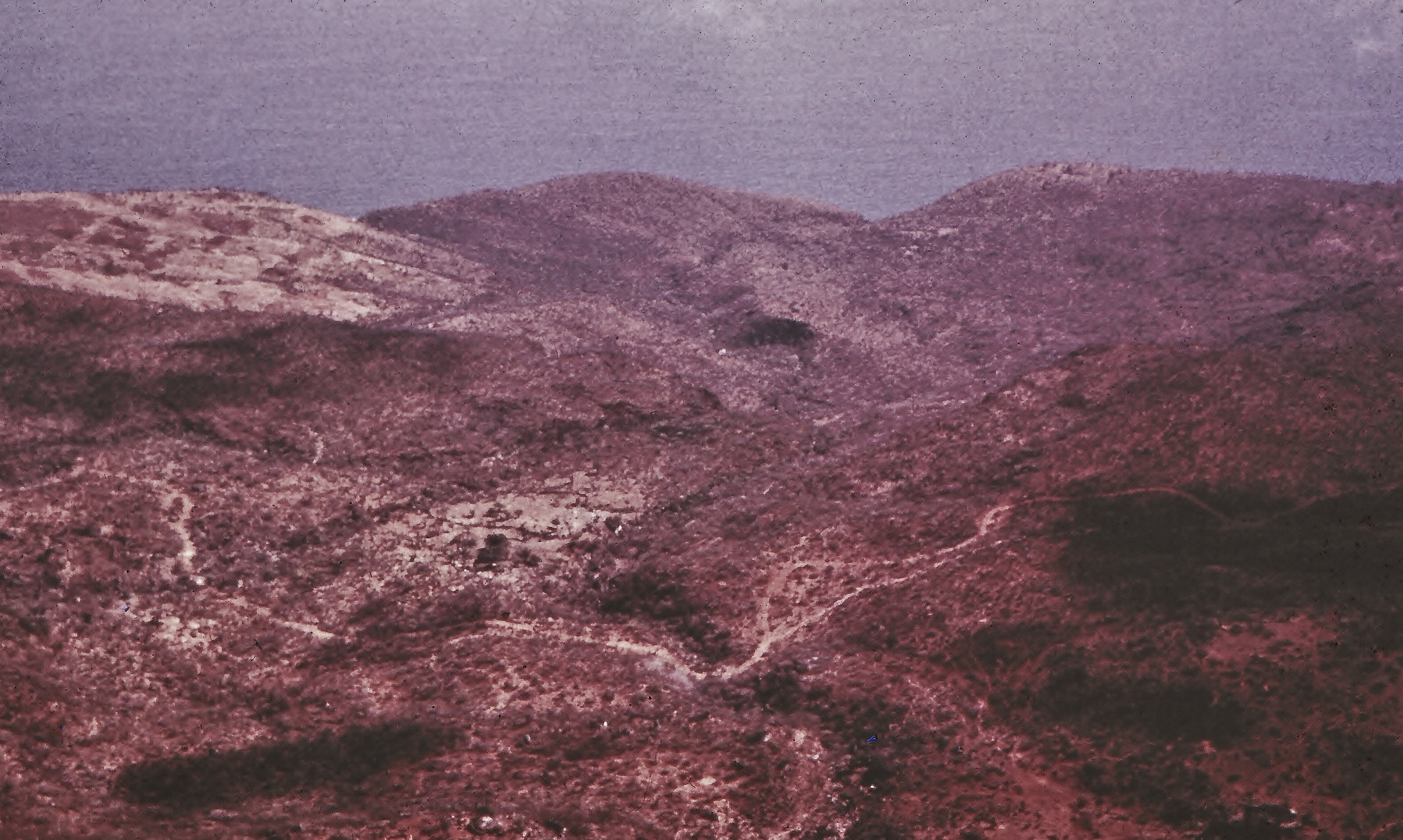
The view from the southern part of the Sarfait position (known as "Mainbrace") looking down the precipice leading to the sea and the track from the PDRY used by the PFLOAG

As Graham and several other commanders had feared, the demands on the Sultan's Air Force to supply and reinforce Sarfait hampered other operations. Some positions recently captured in the eastern jebel had to be abandoned. The remaining troops at Akoot were also withdrawn on 7 May. Nor had the troops on Simba been able to occupy Capstan. Only a very precipitous and rough gully ran down the Sarfait escarpment, and on the night of 4 May, two companies of the Northern Frontier Regiment of the Sultan's Armed Forces failed to negotiate it.

To Graham's disappointment, there had been initially no strong reaction by the PFLOAG to the occupation of the Simba position. On 5 May however, PFLOAG units inside the PDRY opened a heavy bombardment of a fort on the frontier at Habarut, some miles north of Sarfait. The garrison, of paramilitary Dhofar Gendarmerie and a firqat unit, lost radio contact with Salalah. A half company from the Desert Regiment was flown to the area. They found that the Gendarmerie's radio had been damaged and they had withdrawn from the fort. A Special Air Service trooper attached to the firqat had been killed. In retalion, BAC Strikemaster attack aircraft of No. 1 Squadron of the Sultan's Air Force destroyed the fort on the Yemeni side of the frontier. On 22 May they also attacked PFLOAG facilities in Hawf inside the PDRY.

On the night of 26 May, two infantry companies, one each from the Desert Regiment and the Northern Frontier Regiment, and a firqat unit at last succeeded in descending the wadi on the face of the Sarfait escarpment, using ropes. "Capstan" was captured without opposition, and as expected it could dominate the "Freedom Road". However, the promised water source on "Capstan" could not be found, and it also proved impossible to supply the position by helicopter as a PFLOAG machine gun position, with a heavy DShK "Shpagin" machine gun, dominated the landing zones on "Capstan". The SAF's Strikemaster attack aircraft were unable to knock out this post, and the detachment on "Capstan" was withdrawn after four days.

== Siege ==
Further east, the PFLOAG suffered a major defeat at the Battle of Mirbat on 19 July 1972. The PFLOAG nevertheless calculated that the position at Sarfait provided them with an opportunity for a victory. The position could be supplied only by aircraft and helicopters, and the airstrip was vulnerable to fire from the higher ground to the north. On 3 February 1973, PFLOAG opened fire on the airstrip with 75-mm and 106-mm recoilless rifles. They destroyed one aircraft and effectively closed the airstrip.

To maintain Sarfait would have placed an impossible burden on the eight AB 205 helicopters of the Sultan's Air Force. It appeared that the garrison would have to be evacuated either by air or by an overland retreat through PFLOAG-dominated territory, or possibly even forced to surrender. However, Sultan Qaboos's earliest actions on ousting his father had been to seek recognition and aid from other Middle Eastern and Gulf states. While Jordan, Abu Dhabi and Saudi Arabia, all conservative monarchies or sheikhdoms which felt threatened by the PFLOAG's revolutionary agenda, were the first to offer support, the Shah of Iran's aid was most decisive. An Imperial Iranian Battle Group, initially numbering 1600, was sent to Dhofar. The Battle Group had six helicopters, of the same model as those used by the Sultan's Air Force, and starting on 15 February, they were sufficient to keep the Sarfait position supplied.

During the remainder of 1973 and throughout 1974, Sarfait remained under siege, and was intermittently bombarded by mortar bombs and rockets. Elsewhere in Dhofar however, the PFLOAG lost support among the jibali tribes on the jebel and were starved of munitions.

== Operation Hadaf ==
By the start of 1975, the Sultan's Armed Forces and the Imperial Iranian Task Force were preparing a final offensive to clear the rebels, who had renamed their movement the Popular Front for the Liberation of Oman (PFLO) from the western jebel. However, attacks in the early part of the year against the Shershitti Caves were defeated with heavy losses.

The final offensive was codenamed Operation Hadaf. Brigadier John Akehurst, who by this time commanded the Dhofar Brigade, intended to launch the main attack from a recently captured airstrip at Deefa. To distract the PFLO, a diversion was to be launched from Sarfait. By this time, Sarfait was occupied by the Muscat Regiment, commanded by Lieutenant Colonel Ian Christie. For the preceding weeks, the Muscat Regiment had been openly clearing anti-personnel mines from the gully which descended the escarpment, but had covertly cleared another route which descended the back of the ridge.

On 14 October 1975, the Muscat Regiment moved at night down this alternate route, and secured "Capstan" with very little opposition. In response, the PFLO launched a heavy bombardment from 85-mm guns sited inside the PDRY against both the Simba position and the newly captured line. With the Muscat Regimant's unexpected success, Akehurst discarded much of his earlier plan. Two additional infantry companies were flown into Sarfait to reinforce the attack. Major General Ken Perkins, commanding the SAF, ordered Hawker Hunter jets which the SAF had recently acquired from Jordan to attack the PFLO's artillery and rocket positions inside the PDRY. On 17 October, while these air strikes destroyed almost all the guns and greatly reduced the number of shells and mortar bombs which hit the Sarfait position, the two reinforcements companies passed through "Capstan" and reached the sea, establishing a line of outposts which effectively cut the "Freedom Road".

The PFLO resumed the bombardment of Sarfait and the new positions with even heavier 130-mm guns sited further inside the PDRY, which continued until December. Nevertheless, the new position was reinforced and supplied with defence stores lifted by helicopter from a merchant ship, "As-Sultana", operated by the Sultan of Oman's Navy. The Omani strikes into the PDRY were halted on 21 November and international diplomacy secured a ceasefire in December.

On 17 October, the Iranian Task Force began another diversion against Shershitti. The main attack by the Frontier Force Regiment advancing west from Deefa threatened to surround the remaining rebels, and their leaders ordered a retreat into the PDRY. They left behind large numbers of heavy weapons and quantities of munitions. On 2 December, patrols from the Muscat Regiment and Frontier Force met on the Darra Ridge, north of Sarfait, sealing off the western jebel. The rebellion was officially declared to be over on 11 December, although isolated incidents took place until 1980. Diplomatic pressure caused the government of the PDRY to order a ceasefire.

For the four years during which the Sultan's Armed Forces occupied Sarfait, it had been hit by 10,000 mortar bombs, shells and rockets. However, only six soldiers had been killed and twelve wounded by artillery, rather than in patrol operations and sweeps around the base.

== Notes ==
Footnotes

== Bibliography ==
- Jeapes, Tony (1980). SAS Operation Oman. London: William Kimber. ISBN 0-7183-0018-1.\
- McKeown, John (1981). Britain and Oman, The Dhofar War and its Significance. University of Cambridge.
- White, Rowland (2011). Storm Front. Bantam Press. ISBN 9780593064344.
- "The United Kingdom's last hot war of the Cold War: Oman, 1963-75" by Marc DeVore
