= Liberated Areas (Oman) =

Former quasi-state

Liberated Areas المناطِق المُحرّرة (Arabic) al-Manāṭiq al-Muḥrarā
- 1969–Unknown
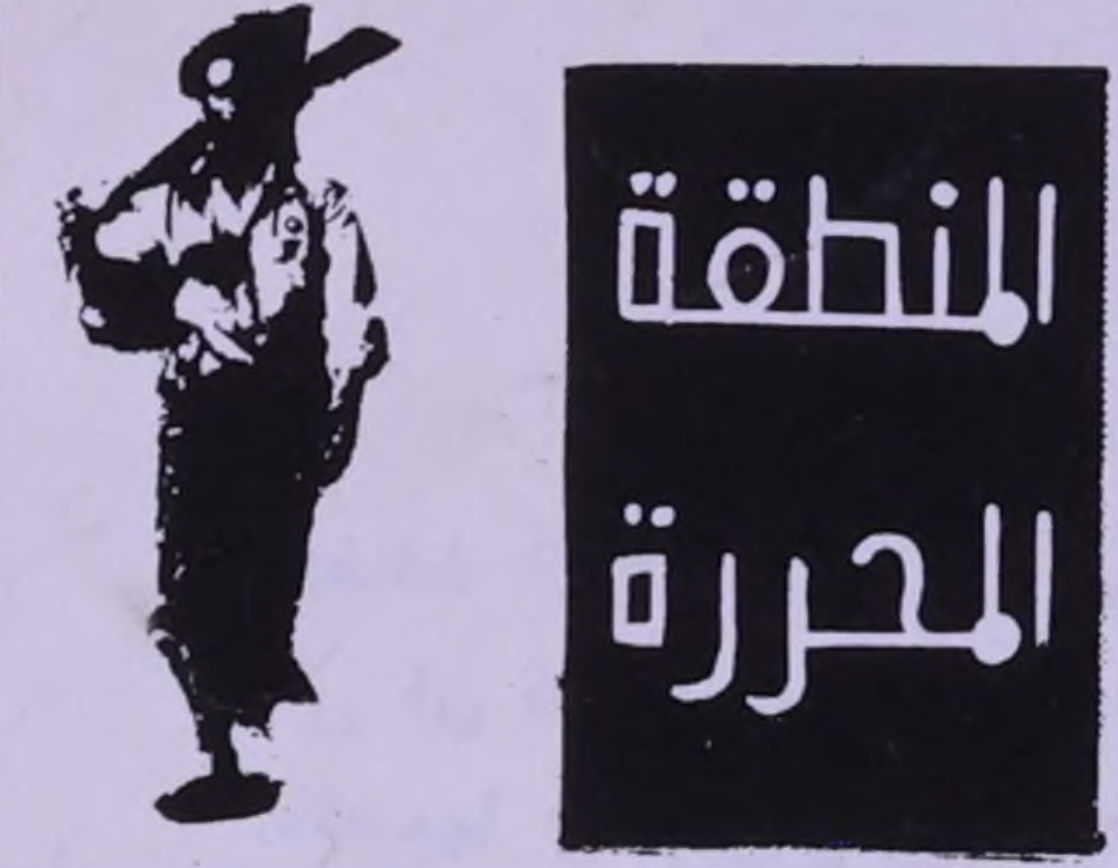
- Flag Emblem

- Map of the Liberated Areas in 1971
- Status: Quasi-state
- Capital: Rakhyut (1969); Dhofar (1971)
- Establishment: Dhofar rebellion
- History
  - Established: August 1969
  - Disestablished: Unknown

Area
  - Total: 99,300 km^{2} (38,300 sq mi)
Preceded by	Succeeded by
Muscat and Oman	Oman
- Today part of: Sultanate of Oman

The Liberated Areas (Arabic: المناطق المحررة) were the areas that used to be under the effective control of the Popular Front for the Liberation of the Occupied Arabian Gulf (PFLOAG), and later the Popular Front for the Liberation of Oman.

== Territorial control ==
In August 1969, the movement captured the coastal town of Rakhyut, which served as the capital of their liberated zone for several years. By 1970, PFLOAG had control of the entire Dhofar region except for the desert and narrow coastal strip of Salalah. By mid-1970, the rebels controlled the coastline from the Aden border to within a few miles of Salalah and held many coastal villages, such as Mirbat and Sadh, east of Salalah. They moved at will through the mountains and along numerous overland routes. The environs of Salalah were sporadically attacked. In pressing their drive, the rebels enjoyed certain advantages: a sanctuary across the Aden border; admirable guerrilla terrain in the mountains and wadis; and the sympathy and cooperation of a substantial proportion of Dhofaris. It is estimated that at one time, about two-thirds of the population supported the rebels. The front looked to civilians to supply informers, messengers, lookouts, and workers.

== Society ==
Political scientist Fred Halliday reported during his visit to the area that "wherever we went we saw people wearing Mao and Lenin badges, reading socialist works and discussing."

=== Women’s rights ===
In 1968, at the Hamrin Conference, the PFLOAG committed itself to women's emancipation, seeing it as intrinsic to the broader liberation of Dhofar. Traditionally, the women of Dhofar enjoyed a relatively good position compared to women of other regions in the area. Abdel Razzaq Takriti notes that "[w]omen participated in work and were not socially segregated. They were allowed to smoke (although rarely did so) and could travel without a male companion." However, women were still restricted in their emancipation at that time since few enjoyed the opportunity to travel for education, for example.

Although the PFLOAG had adopted a quite absolute stance on women's emancipation, they were not entirely successful in implementing their aspirations. From 1968 onward, there was a gradual implementation of laws against polygamy and female circumcision, and a promotion of equal inheritance rights. The latter was retracted, however, due to opposition in the ranks of the Front. Women were also recruited in the Front's army and could participate in its schools. This was done to fight oppression on a broader scale, rather than only focusing on political oppression by the Sultan. It has been argued that gender is an important factor in the practice of sectarianism, as well as tribalism, which were both considered by the Front's leadership as forms of oppression.

Heiny Srour has mentioned that the Front's stance on feminism inspired her to film her 1974 documentary on the Dhofar War, called The Hour of Liberation Has Arrived. In this documentary, she attempted to capture the "avant-garde feminism" of the movement.
