= Musallam (name) =

Musallam is a masculine given name and surname of Arabic origin. Notable people with the name include:

== Given name ==
- Musallam Al-Barrak (born 1956), Kuwaiti politician
- Musallam Bseiso (1926–2017), Palestinian journalist
- Musallam bin Nufl (died 2013), Omani politician

== Surname ==
- Sara Musallam, Emirati businesswoman and politician

== See also ==
- Musaylima
