= Monsoon Revolution =

Monsoon Revolution could refer to:

- Dhofar rebellion
- July Revolution (Bangladesh)
