= Battle of Deefa =

- Part of Dhofar Rebellion
Date	May 1968
Location	Deefa, Dhofar
Result	DLF victory

Belligerents
Dhofar Liberation Front (DLF)	Muscat and Oman

The Battle of Deefa took place in May 1968 where a battalion of the Sultan of Oman's Armed Forces attacked a rebel position at Deefa, in the Jebel Qamar and was defeated.
