= Popular Front for the Liberation of Oman =

Far-left political party in Oman from 1974 to 1992

Popular Front for the Liberation of Oman الجبهة الشعبية لتحرير عُمان (Arabic)
- Abbreviation: PFLO
- Founded: 1974
- Dissolved: 1994 (unofficial)
- Preceded by: Popular Front for the Liberation of Oman and the Arabian Gulf
- Youth wing: Oman Youth Organization
- Ideology: Marxism–Leninism; Arab nationalism Scientific socialism Feminism
- Political position: Left-wing
- International affiliation: Arab Nationalist Movement
- Allies: South Yemen; China
- Opponents: Oman; Pahlavi Iran; United Kingdom
- Slogan: Arabic: نضال حتى يتحرر الوطن ويتحد

Party flag

The Popular Front for the Liberation of Oman (PFLO; Arabic: الجبهة الشعبية لتحرير عُمان, romanized: al-Jabha aš-Šaʿbiyya li-Taḥrīr ʿUmān) was a Marxist and Arab nationalist revolutionary organisation in the Sultanate of Oman. It fought against the Al Bu Said dynasty in the Dhofar Rebellion from the PFLO's foundation and remained active until 1994.

== Formation ==
The main forerunner of the PFLO was the Dhofar Liberation Front (جبهة تحرير ظفار - Jabhat Tahrir Dhofar, DLF) which was based in Dhofar, the southern province of Oman. It was founded in 1962 by the Dhofar Benevolent Society (DBS), the Dhofar Soldiers’ Organisation (DSO) and the local branch of the Arab Nationalist Movement (ANM) and began armed struggle in June 1965.

In September 1968 the DLF was renamed the Popular Front for the Liberation of the Occupied Arabian Gulf (PFLOAG). Its members were inclined towards the leftist, Marxist-Leninist tendency in the ANM, and were also influenced by the revolutionary experience of neighbouring South Yemen.

In June 1970 the National Democratic Front for the Liberation of Oman and the Arabian Gulf (NDFLOAG) was founded in the north of Oman. It merged with the PFLOAG in December 1971. The new organisation was called Popular Front for the Liberation of Oman and the Arabian Gulf (PFLOAG). By 1973 reports surged that PFLOAG had formed clandestine cells within the UAE armed forces.

The group took its later name, Popular Front for the Liberation of Oman (PFLO), in 1974 when the Popular Front for the Liberation of Bahrain (PFLB) was established as a separate organisation. The PFLO appears to have maintained some underground activity afterwards. The youth wing of PFLO was the Oman Youth Organization, and it published the 'Uman ath-Thawrah.

== Dhofar Rebellion ==
Map showing the lands claimed by the PFLO

Upon its establishment, the PFLOAG became involved in the ongoing Dhofar rebellion against Sultan Sa'id. It suffered a split in 1970 when some of its more right-wing members decided to accept the offer of an amnesty from the newly enthroned Sultan Qaboos. The new ruler was successful in pacifying most of Dhofar, with the help of considerable military and financial aid from the Western bloc, and by 1976 the rebellion was at an end.

== See also ==
- Liberated Areas (Oman)

== Sources ==
- Omania.net discussion board (in Arabic)
- Nadyelfikr.net discussion board (in Arabic)
- Dhofar Rebellion in Oman 1964–1975, OnWar.com, December 16, 2000
