= Operation Jaguar =

Operation Jaguar may refer to:

- Operation Jaguar (Oman), culminating British operation of the Dhofar Rebellion (October 1971)
- Operation Jaguar (Croatia), the Croatian capture of Križ Hill during the Battle of the Miljevci Plateau (17–22 May 1992)
- Operation Jaguar (Canadian), contribution of military aviation and search-and-rescue capability in support of the Jamaica Defence Force
- Operation Jaguar (United Kingdom), Greater Manchester Police investigation on Cyril Smith
