= Popular Front for the Liberation of the Occupied Arabian Gulf =

Armed Group in Oman

Popular Front for the Liberation of the Occupied Arabian Gulf; (1968–1971); الجبهة الشعبية لتحرير الخليج العربي المحتل (Arabic); Popular Front for the Liberation of Oman and the Arabian Gulf; (1971–1974); الجبهة الشعبية لتحرير عُمان والخليج العربي (Arabic)
- Founded: 1968
- Dissolved: 1974
- Preceded by: Dhofar Liberation Front (1968); NDFLOAG (1971)
- Succeeded by: Popular Front for the Liberation of Oman; Popular Front for the Liberation of Bahrain
- Headquarters: Hawf, South Yemen
- Ideology: Marxism–Leninism; Arab nationalism Scientific socialism Feminism
- Political position: Left-wing
- International affiliation: Arab Nationalist Movement
- Allies: South Yemen; China
- Opponents: Muscat and Oman (until 1970); Oman (from 1970); Pahlavi Iran; United Kingdom
- Slogan: نحو ثورة شاملة في ساحة عمان والخليج العربي (Towards a complete revolution in Oman and Arabian Gulf region)

Party flag

The Popular Front for the Liberation of the Occupied Arabian Gulf (PFLOAG), (Note: Arabic: الجبهة الشعبية لتحرير الخليج العربي المحتل, romanized: al-Jabhah ash-Shaʿbiyyah li-Taḥrīr al-Khalīj al-ʿArabī al-Muḥtall.) later renamed to the Popular Front for the Liberation of Oman and the Arabian Gulf, (Note: Arabic: الجبهة الشعبية لتحرير عُمان والخليج العربي, romanized: al-Jabhah ash-Shaʿbiyyah li-Taḥrīr ʿUmān wa-l-Khalīj al-ʿArabī.) was a revolutionary Marxist–Leninist organization that operated in Dhofar and the Persian Gulf from 1968 to 1974.

Formed as the successor to the Dhofar Liberation Front (DLF) during the Hamrin Congress of 1968, the organization was active in armed struggle against the monarchies of the Arab states of the Persian Gulf, culminating in the Dhofar Rebellion against the Sultanate of Oman. PFLOAG's goal was the establishment of an Arab socialist state in the Gulf region through the strategy of fighting a people's war.

Through its commitment to scientific socialism, the organization implemented social reforms in its "liberated areas," including the promotion of women's rights and the abolition of tribal structures. It was rebranded to the Popular Front for the Liberation of Oman (PFLO) in 1974.

== History ==
The PFLOAG was formally established during the Second Congress of the Dhofar Liberation Front (DLF), held in Wadi Hamrin from 1 to 20 September 1968, where the DLF changed its name to the "Popular Front for the Liberation of the Occupied Arabian Gulf". Influenced by the victory of the National Liberation Front in South Yemen, the delegates adopted scientific socialism as their official ideology. The PFLOAG's goal was the establishment of an Arab socialist state in the Gulf region through the strategy of fighting a people's war in the region against British colonialism and local "reactionary" regimes, specifically the Al Bu Said dynasty in Oman.

The organization viewed its revolution in Dhofar as the "vanguard" of a broader movement intended to liberate the entire Persian Gulf region, which they termed "occupied" due to the pervasive British military and political presence. A new National Command was elected, dominated by cadres who had been trained in China and South Yemen.

The Front sought to establish a constitution, abolish martial law, restore freedom of the press and expression, and ensure the rights of minorities. On economic issues, it intended to nationalize the oil companies, develop industries, and implement land reform. The Front called for more social justice and affirmed its support for all Asian, African, and Latin American liberation movements. References were also made to the Palestinian struggle. The rebels opened schools which served both boys and girls (girls' education was forbidden in Oman until 1970). The group fought against tribalism and promoted the role of women, including in armed struggle.

Following the congress, the PFLOAG armed wing, known as the People's Liberation Army (PLA), launched a military campaign against the Sultan's Armed Forces (SAF). Utilizing the rugged terrain of the Jebel and the seasonal cover provided by the khareef, the Front seized control of significant portions of western and central Dhofar. In August 1969, the movement captured the coastal town of Rakhyut, which served as the capital of their liberated zone for several years. By 1970, PFLOAG had control of the entire Dhofar region except for the desert and narrow coastal strip of Salalah.

Having close relations with the government of South Yemen, the PFLOAG opened an office there. In China, which sought to continue deepening its relations with South Yemen and viewed PFLOAG as proteges of the National Liberation Front in South Yemen, supported PFLOAG. China distanced itself from PFLOAG in 1971 as part of efforts to improve its diplomatic relations with the Arab states.

In 1970, a separate revolutionary group, the National Democratic Front for the Liberation of Oman and the Arabian Gulf (NDFLOAG), launched an armed uprising in northern Oman. Although it was suppressed by British-led forces, it led to a formal merger between the two organizations in December 1971. The unified body adopted the name Popular Front for the Liberation of Oman and the Arabian Gulf, retaining the PFLOAG acronym.

In 1974 the organization was divided into two separate bodies: the Popular Front for the Liberation of Oman and the Popular Front for the Liberation of Bahrain.

The PFLO leadership pledged to continue on the "trail of struggle", as Al-Ghassani (Note: Muhammad ibn Ahamad Al-Ghassani was one of the leading commanders in the PFLOAG and their spokesperson, later he returned to Muscat in the 1980s when the Sultan of Oman decided to pardon the PFLOAG members.) put it in an address on June 9, 1978, that marked the thirteenth anniversary of the revolution:

We are committing ourselves to fight alongside our Omani people in the Gulf and the Arabian Peninsula against the ambitions of imperialism and Iranian expansion

== Ideology ==
Map showing the lands claimed by the PFLOAG

PFLOAG's leadership described their stance as Marxist-Leninist.

=== Feminism ===
In 1968, at the Hamrin Conference, the PFLOAG committed itself to women's emancipation, seeing it as intrinsic to the broader liberation of Dhofar. Traditionally, the women of Dhofar enjoyed a relatively good position compared to women of other regions in the area. Abdel Razzaq Takriti notes that "[w]omen participated in work and were not socially segregated. They were allowed to smoke (although rarely did so) and could travel without a male companion." However, women were still restricted in their emancipation at that time since few enjoyed the opportunity to travel for education for example.

Although the PFLOAG had adopted a quite absolute stance on women's emancipation, they were not entirely successful in implementing their aspirations. From 1968 onward, there was a gradual implementation of laws against polygamy and female circumcision, and a promotion of equal inheritance rights. The last was retracted, however, due to opposition in the ranks of the Front. Women also were recruited in the Front's army and could participate in its schools. This was done to fight oppression on a broader scale, rather than only focusing on political oppression by the Sultan. It has been argued that gender is an important factor in the practice of sectarianism, as well as tribalism, which were both considered by the Front's leadership as forms of oppression.

Heiny Srour has mentioned that the Front's stance on feminism inspired her to film her 1974 documentary on the Dhofar War, called The Hour of Liberation Has Arrived. In this documentary, she attempted to capture the "avant-garde feminism" of the movement.

== See also ==
- Liberated Areas (Oman)
