= Leila and the Wolves =

1984 drama film by Heiny Srour

- Directed by: Heiny Srour
- Starring: Nabila Zeitoun; Rafik Ali Ahmad
- Cinematography: Charlet Recors; Curtis Clark
- Edited by: Eva Houdova
- Music by: Bachir Mounir; Nassif Laki
- Release date: 1984
- Running time: 90 min.
- Countries: France; Sweden; Britain; Belgium; Netherlands; Lebanon
- Language: Arabic

Leila and the Wolves (Arabic: ليلى والذئاب) is a 1984 drama film from Lebanese director Heiny Srour and assistant director Sabah Jabbour.

It was filmed in often treacherous areas and the filming lasted seven years. In the film, the protagonist Leila, a modern Lebanese woman living in London, time travels through the 1900s to the 1980s, with each trip focusing on the centrality of women in Palestinian and Lebanese resistance movements. Srour described the film as a "disillusioned" work depicting the injustices leading to violence and war that most damages the vulnerable, while not idealizing the oppressed. The film won the Grand Prize in the Third World competition at the International Filmfestival Mannheim-Heidelberg.

== Plot ==
In present day London, Leila is preparing for a photography exhibit on Palestine. She takes her partner Rafiq on a historical tour of Palestinian and Lebanese history, showing the imagined role of women in these events. The film depicts the 1936–1939 Palestinian revolt, the Deir Yassin massacre, and the Lebanese Civil War. Throughout the film, repeated scenes show Leila in a white dress surrounded by women in black burkas on an unidentified beach.
