= Sarfait =

- Location on the Oman–Yemen border
- Coordinates: 16°41′2″N 53°6′46″E
- Country: Oman
- Governorate: Dhofar

Sarfait, also transcribed as Sarfayt or Sarfeet, is a settlement in the Dhofar Governorate of Oman on the coast of the Arabian Sea, near the border with Yemen. There is an international border checkpoint at Sarfait; on the Yemeni side of the border is the settlement of Hawf.

== History ==
There was much conflict in the area between the Omani government and communist-inspired armed guerrillas during the Dhofar Rebellion in the 1960s and 1970s. On 9 June 1975, an aggressive mortar and missile attack was launched on Sarfait. In September 1975, the government forces responded and took formal military action against the PFLO. Led by John Akehurst, a diversionary attack was launched by the Dhofar Brigade of the Sultan of Oman's Armed Forces from the government's mountaintop garrison in Sarfait.
