= Musallam bin Nufl =

Omani politician

Musallam bin Nufl (?-July 7, 2013), was a key insurgent leadership figure of the Dhofar Liberation Front (DLF) which was the main rebel force in Southern Oman in the 1960s. He was also a senior member of an influential and large Dhofari desert tribe known as the Bait Kathir (al Kathiri).

In 1963 Musallam bin Nufl who had been a member of the Omani Sultan's household staff traveled to meet other Omani dissidents living in Dammam in Saudi Arabia, who had twice failed to set up a separate Imamate in the north of the country. Bin Nufl and the DLF would commence guerrilla operations on his return from Iraq and Saudi Arabia later in 1963. The DLF though would wait till 1965 before declaring its intent although it would have to wait until the British withdrawal from neighboring Aden in 1967 before receiving a further injection of support from the now avowed Marxist People's Democratic Republic of Yemen. According to official reports in February 1966 Musallam bin Nufl was seriously injured whilst attempting smuggle arms from Saudi Arabia into Oman, the convoy that he was leading was interdicted by Omani armed forces and all vehicles destroyed.

In 1968 a conference of senior leaders of the various liberation factions decided to opt for a more Marxist approach to achieving success against Western-backed royal families. Musallam bin Nufl and other key leaders of the DLF rejected the more Marxist regional anti-British cause, choosing to stick with their more narrow nationalist and separatist agenda in Dhofar. In fact once the highly conservative Sultan Said bin Taimur was replaced by his son Qaboos bin Said in 1970 many in the original DLF leadership group (including Musallam bin Nufl and Yusuf bin Alawi bin Abdullah) allied themselves with new and more progressive Sultan; they reasoned that with the change in ruler in the Sultanate the DLF had achieved what it needed.

== See also ==
- Omani Civil War (1963-76)
- Arab Nationalist Movement
- Yusuf bin Alawi bin Abdullah
- Dhofar Governorate
- Yemen
- Arabian Sands

== Other Sources ==
- Encyclopedia of the Stateless Nations: D–K – Dhofaris
- Aden Insurgency: The Savage War in Yemen 1962-67
