= The Hour of Liberation Has Arrived =

1974 Lebanese film

- Directed by: Heiny Srour
- Written by: Heiny Srour
- Produced by: Heiny Srour
- Cinematography: Michel Humeau
- Edited by: Heiny Srour
- Production company: Srour Films
- Release date: 1974
- Running time: 62 minutes
- Countries: France; Lebanon; United Kingdom
- Language: Arabic

The Hour of Liberation Has Arrived (Arabic: ساعة التحرير دقت) is a 1974 documentary film directed, written, produced and edited by Lebanese filmmaker Heiny Srour. The film documents the Dhofar rebellion in Oman, focusing in particular on the role of women. The film is notable for being the first film directed by an Arab woman to be shown at Cannes. It is also the most thorough document of the Dhofar rebellion.

== Production ==
Srour was compelled to make the film during her work as a film critic for AfricAsia in 1969, she was interviewing a male delegate of the PFLOAG. She was interested in the feminist description of the Oman liberation group, a moment that Terri Ginsberg describes as "revelatory" for Srour and thus she shifted her focus to documenting the Omani struggle for liberation.

Srour and her crew traveled 500 miles across the desert and mountains and under the bombardment of the British Royal Air Force so that they could shoot the film in Dhofar. According to Srour the sync camera had to be powered by a solar battery due to a lack of available electricity.

== Plot ==
Per Terri Ginsberg in her book Films of Arab Loutfi and Heiny Srour: Studies in Palestine Solidarity Cinema, The Hour of Liberation Has Arrived, "....focuses on the struggle of the Omani people, represented by the DFLP-allied PFLOAG, for their liberation from the oppressive, British-backed Sultanate of Qaboos ibn Sa‘id, a notorious collaborator with neocolonial oil interests." Beginning as a contemporary news report, the film later portrays the guerilla fighters, primarily focusing on female participation in the movement.

== Reception ==
The film was awarded the Grand Prix du Scenario by the Tunisian Agence de coopération culturelle et technique (ACCT). According to Srour the film was banned throughout the Arab world and was shown infrequently.
