= Operation Jaguar (Oman) =

SAS Operation during the Dhofar Rebellion

- Part of Dhofar Rebellion
Date	October 1971
Location	Oman
Result	British/Omani victory

Belligerents
(United Kingdom) SAS G Squadron; Royal Air Force of Oman	PFLOAG

Commanders and leaders
John Watts; Richard Duke Pirie	Unknown

Strength
G Squadron SAS; B Squadron SAS; 5 Firqat	Unknown

Operation Jaguar was a military operation that took place in the Dhofar Rebellion.
