= Jack Fletcher (British Army officer) =

20th century British Army officer

Jack Spencer Fletcher
- Born: 28 August 1928; Romney Marsh, Kent
- Died: 10 October 1976 (aged 48); Petersfield
- Military career
- Allegiance: United Kingdom
- Branch: British Army
- Service years: 1948–1976
- Rank: Brigadier
- Service number: 397244
- Commands: Deputy military secretary Dhofar Brigade; 2nd Battalion Queen's Regiment
- Conflicts: Malayan Emergency; Dhofar Rebellion
- Awards: Commander of the Order of the British Empire

Brigadier Jack Spencer Fletcher, CBE (13 August 1928 – 10 October 1976) was a British Army officer who played a key part in the Dhofar Rebellion.

== Military career ==
Jack Fletcher was commissioned into Queen's Own Royal West Kent Regiment in 1948. He was appointed commanding officer of 2nd Battalion Queen's Regiment in 1969 and led the battalion in The Troubles in Northern Ireland.

In 1972 he commanded the Dhofar Brigade of the Sultan of Oman's Armed Forces against a communist-inspired armed insurrection during the Dhofar Rebellion. They were commanded to "concentrate on pacifcation and civil development work in Eastern jebel." He laid the foundation for the subsequent success of the operation by constructing a blocking line, "known as Hornbeam" which provided "a permanent presence on the jebel, and a means to patrol aggressively against the adoo."

He spent two years as deputy military secretary from 1974 to 1976 when he became ill. Fletcher had been selected for promotion to major-general before his death.
