= Muscat Regiment =

- Royal Army of Oman
- Active: From 1957 to date
- Country: Oman
- Type: Infantry
- Role: Motorised infantry
- Size: One battalion
- Garrison/HQ: Bid Bid, Oman
- Engagements: Jebel Akhdar & Dhofar Wars
- Decorations

The Muscat Regiment (MR) was formed in March 1957 and was one of the first two properly constituted infantry regiments that Sultan Said bin Taimur of Oman formed. The regiment's crest is two crossed Omani swords overlain vertically with a single traditional Khanjar dagger sheathed, with scrolls carrying the regimental title in Arabic. The regiment's headdress is a distinctive scarlet Tam o' Shanter style cap, rather than a beret. Members of the Regiment who served in Dhofar are entitled to wear the General Service Medal Oman, its ribbon design illustrated on the right (see Decorations).

== Unit history ==
The MR and Northern Frontier Regiment are the two most senior infantry regiments in RAO; and were formed from earlier less formal units of doubtful capabilities and were an attempt by British advisors to the Sultan to develop a more credible armed forces to respond to a number of persistent threats from some interior tribes and their financial sponsors in Saudi Arabia.

The Sultanate of Oman (with Dhofar highlighted)

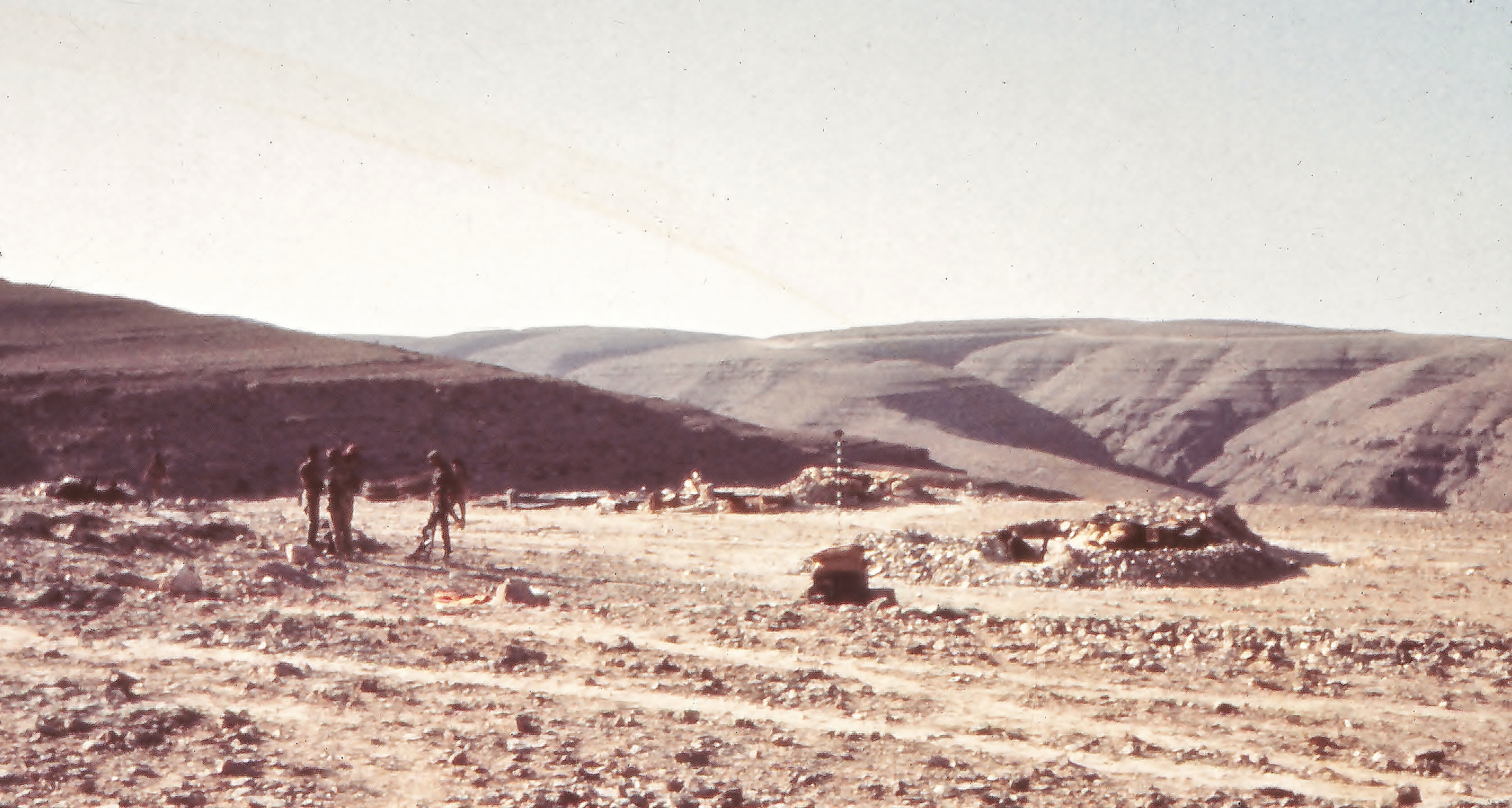
A Dhofar Brigade defensive position in 1972

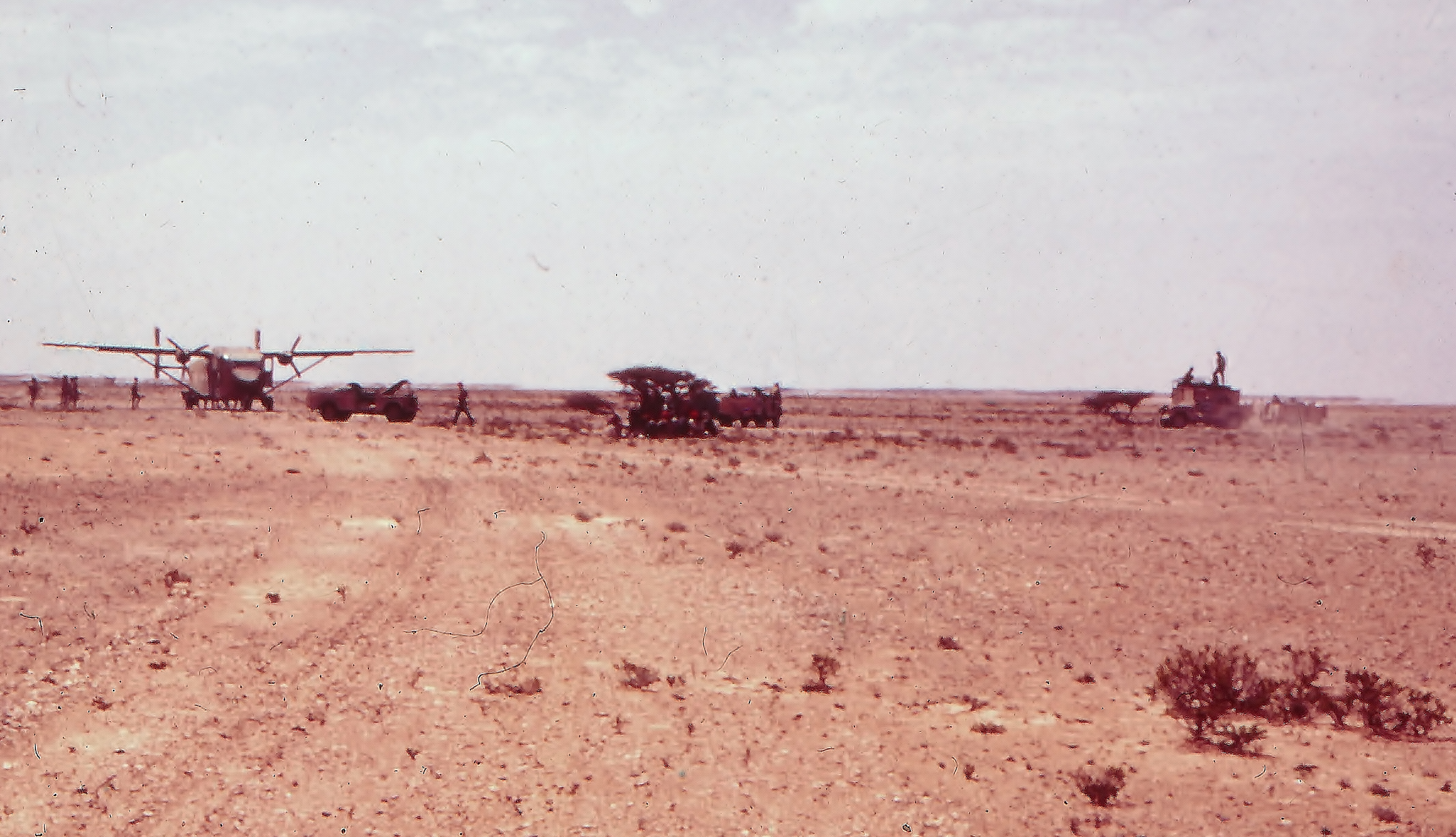
A Short SC.7 Skyvan resupplying Dhofar Brigade units in 1971

The unit would also see service in the Dhofar War along with other regiments of the Sultan's small army, which mostly supporting the Dhofar Brigade's operations in the 1970s fighting Communist insurgents in the south of the country

The MR remains on the Order of Battle of the Royal Army of Oman and is based in Bidbid.

== Commanding officers ==
MR's Commanding officers have included:

- Lieutenant Colonel Thomas Jim "Bill" Bowen 1961–1962
- Lieutenant Colonel John Murdoch Cooper 1962–1966
- Lieutenant Colonel Peter Thwaites 1967

== See also ==
- Omani Civil War (1963-76)
- Sultan of Oman's Armed Forces
- Sultan's Armed Forces Museum
- David Smiley
- Trucial Oman Scouts
