= Northern Frontier Regiment =

- Royal Army of Oman
- Active: From 1957 to date
- Country: Oman
- Type: Infantry
- Role: Motorised infantry
- Size: One battalion
- Garrison/HQ: Malik bin Faham Camp, Ibri, Oman
- Engagements: Jebel Akhdar & Dhofar Wars
- Decorations

Commanders
- Notable commanders: Lt Col Colin Maxwell OM

The Northern Frontier Regiment (NFR) was formed in March 1957 and was one of the first two properly constituted infantry regiments that Sultan Said bin Taimur of Oman formed. The regiment's crest is two crossed drawn traditional Khanjar daggers pointing downwards, with scrolls carrying the regimental title in Arabic i.e. Kateeba al Hudood al Shamleeah. Members of the Regiment who served in Dhofar are entitled to wear the General Service Medal Oman, its ribbon design illustrated on the right (see Decorations).

== Unit history ==
The NFR and Muscat Regiment are the two most senior infantry regiments in RAO; and were formed from earlier less formal units of doubtful capabilities and were an attempt by British advisors to the Sultan to develop a more credible armed forces to respond to a number of persistent threats from some interior tribes and their financial sponsors in Saudi Arabia. These tensions came to a head in the Jebel Akhdar War in which the regiment played a particularly active part. Once the rebels were driven from the mountain NFR established a base at one of the main villages (Saiq).

The Sultanate of Oman (with Dhofar highlighted)

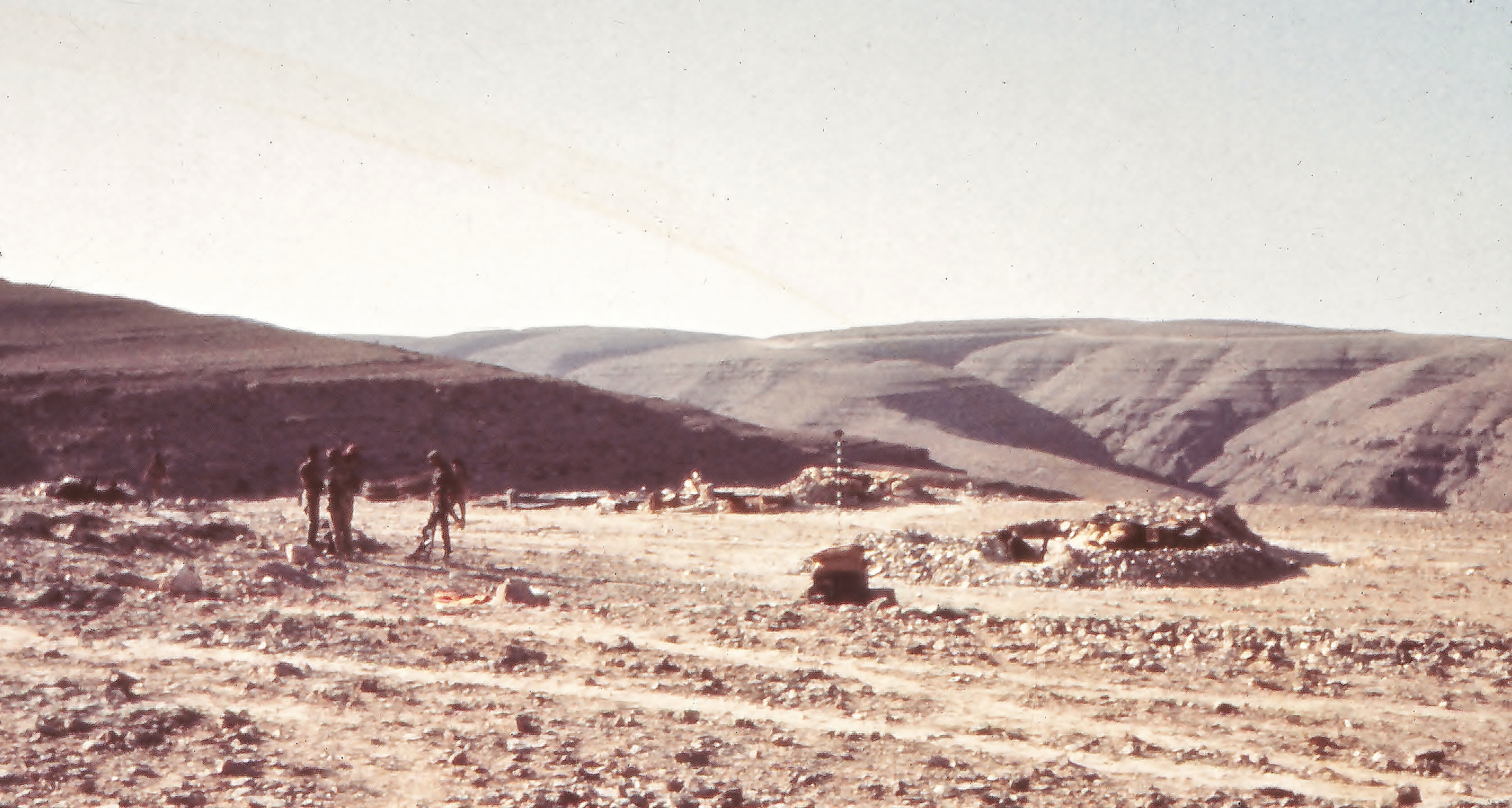
A Dhofar Brigade defensive position in 1972

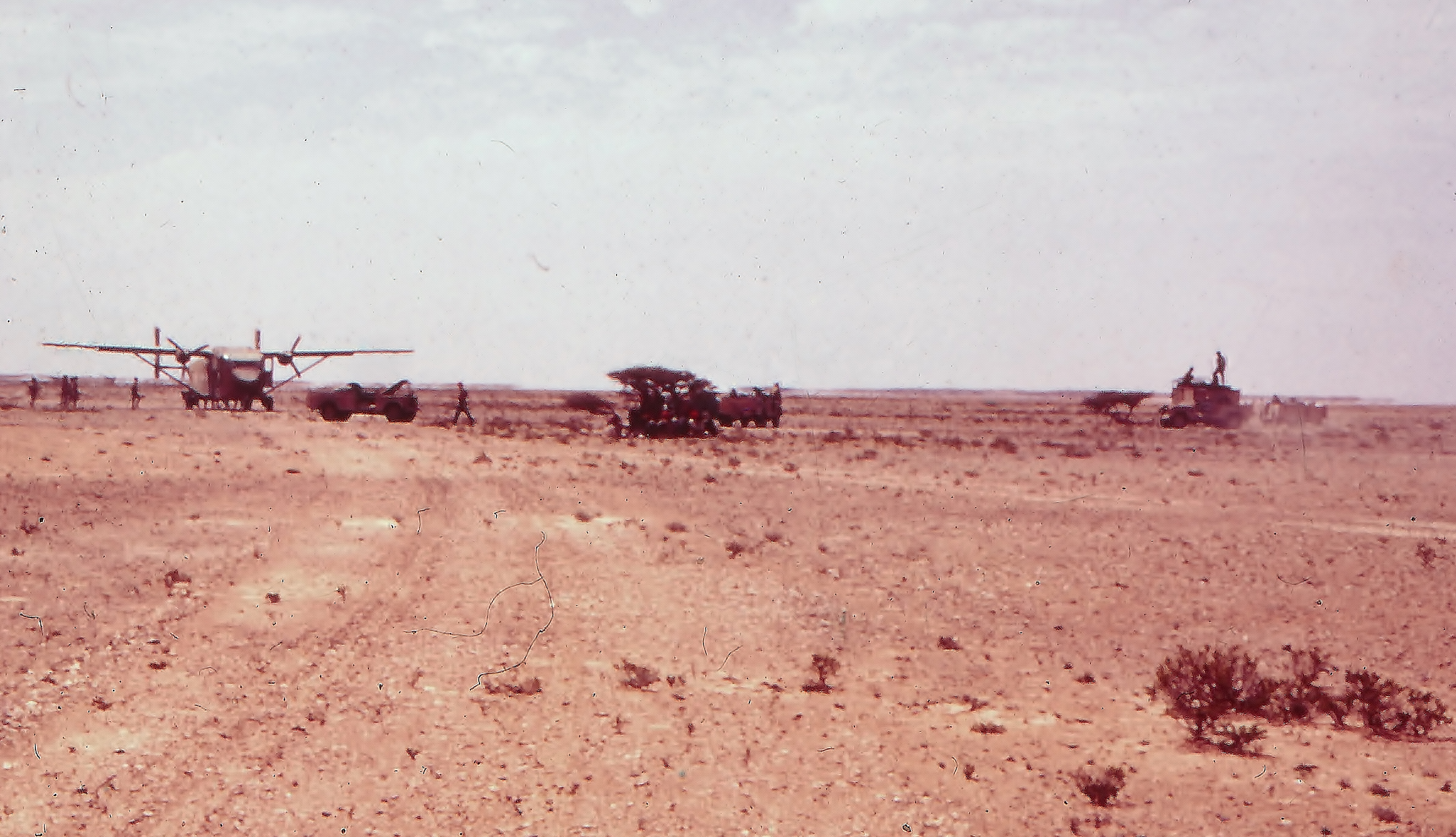
A Short SC.7 Skyvan resupplying Dhofar Brigade units in 1971

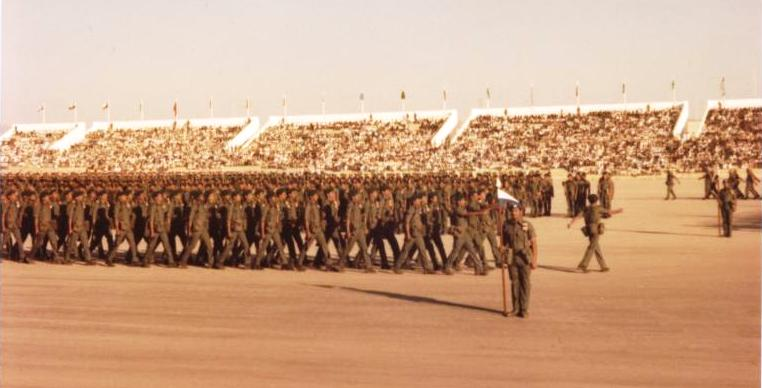
The Northern Frontier Regiment on parade at the National Stadium in Ruwi in 1981

The unit would also see service in the Dhofar War along with other regiments of the Sultan's small army, which mostly supporting the Dhofar Brigade's operations in the 1970s fighting Communist insurgents in the south of the country. The NFR were one of the first regiments from Northern Oman to be deployed south to Dhofar to suppress a rebellion in 1964. During the Dhofar Campaign NFR lost many killed and wounded including one of the first British military advisors killed on operations - Captain Alan William Woodman (formerly of the Royal Marines) killed on 13 March 1966.

The NFR remains on the Order of Battle of the Royal Army of Oman and is based in Ibri.

== Commanding officers ==
NFR's Commanding officers have included:

- Lieutenant Colonel (later Brigadier) Colin Maxwell - who set up the regiment in 1957 which was based in and around Nizwa during the Jebel Akhdar Campaign
- Lieutenant Colonel Hugh Sanders
- Lieutenant Colonel Michael Harvey
- Lieutenant Colonel Bryan Ray MBE

== UK personnel Killed in Action whilst Serving with the Regiment ==
The following UK seconded and contract personnel were killed in action (KIA) whilst serving with NFR:

- Acting Sergeant Alan Frederick Hedges RM KIA Jebel Akhdar 16 April 1958
- Colour Sergeant Jack Lovell Halford RM BEM KIA Jebel Akhdar 17 June 1958
- Captain Alan William Woodman (late Sgt RM) KIA Dhofar 13 March 1966
- Captain Hamish Brian Emslie MC (late Capt RM) KIA Dhofar 24 May 1966
- Local Captain Stuart James Rae (late RM) KIA Dhofar 12 June 1971

== See also ==
- Omani Civil War (1963-76)
- Sultan of Oman's Armed Forces
- Sultan's Armed Forces Museum
- David Smiley
- Trucial Oman Scouts
