= National Democratic Front for the Liberation of Oman and the Arabian Gulf =

Armed Group in Oman

- الجبهة الوطنية الديمقراطية لتحرير عمان والخليج العربي
- Dates active: 1969–December 1971
- Active regions: Northern Oman
- Ideology: Ba'athism
- Wars: Dhofar War

The National Democratic Front for the Liberation of Oman and the Arabian Gulf (Arabic: الجبهة الوطنية الديمقراطية لتحرير عمان والخليج العربي, romanized: al-Jabha al-Wataniya ad-Dimuqratiya li-Tahrir 'Uman wa-l-Khalij al-'Arabi, abbreviated NDFLOAG) was a guerrilla movement based in northern Oman.

== Formation ==
NDFLOAG was formed in Iraq in 1969 by Omani students (primarily studying in Kuwait) and other emigrees. Some had been members of left-wing organizations (such as the Arab Nationalist Movement), others were hitherto unorganized opponents of the Omani government. In difference to the other, larger, rural guerrilla movement Popular Front for the Liberation of the Occupied Arabian Gulf (PFLOAG), NDFLOAG was predominantly an urban movement. NDFLOAG was supported by urban intellectuals. Ideologically, PFLOAG was Marxist whilst NDFLOAG was Ba'ath-oriented. When it was publicly launched, NDFLOAG had branches in different towns in Oman and in most of the other parts of the Persian Gulf.

== Operations ==
NDFLOAG began guerrilla operations in northern Oman on June 12, 1970 attacking garrisons at the towns of Izki and Nizwa with mortars. Both attacks failed. The attack on a SAF army post outside Izki was repelled, and the entire unit was either killed or captured. Afterwards several arrests were made, based on testimonies from prisoners from the Izki raid, and three NDFLOAG arms caches in Muti, Sur and Matrah had been stored was seized by the state forces. These crack-downs lead to a temporary ceasing of NDFLOAG activities in Oman. The group continued to organize outside Oman.

Although the June 12, 1970 attacks had been fought off, they functioned as a catalyst for the groups that conspired against the Sultan Said bin Taimur (which soon thereafter led to the overthrow of the Sultan by his son Qaboos bin Said, with British support). The attacks had caught SAF by surprise, and the attacks contributed to the perception that Said bin Taimur was unable to defeat the insurgency.

In 1971, having suffered military setbacks, NDFLOAG began seeking cooperation with PFLOAG. In December 1971 NDFLOAG and PFLOAG merged, forming the Popular Front for the Liberation of Oman and the Arabian Gulf, although the two groups retained separate organizational structures.
