= Heiny Srour =

Lebanese film director

- Born: هايني سرور (Arabic); March 23, 1945 (age 81); Beirut
- Occupation: Film director
- Known for: First female Arab filmmaker to have a film chosen for the Cannes Film Festival
- Notable work: The Hour of Liberation Has Arrived, Leila and the Wolves

Heiny Srour (Arabic: هايني سرور; born March 23, 1945) is a Lebanese film director. She is best known for being the first female Arab filmmaker to have a film (The Hour of Liberation Has Arrived) chosen for the Cannes Film Festival. Srour advocated for women's rights through her films, her writing, and by funding other filmmakers.

== Career ==
Born in 1945 in Beirut to a Jewish family, Srour studied sociology at the American University of Beirut and then completed a doctorate in social anthropology at the Sorbonne. Her first film, Bread of Our Mountains (1968, 3 minutes, 16mm) was lost during the Lebanese Civil War.

In 1974, her film The Hour of Liberation Has Arrived, about the Dhofar rebellion in Oman, was selected to compete at the Cannes Film Festival, making Srour the first Arab woman to have a film selected for the international festival. It is believed that her documentary film The Hour of Liberation Has Arrived was actually the first film by any female filmmaker to be screened at the festival. Srour cites Federico Fellini's film 8½ as a significant inspiration for the film. However, despite the film's accolades and success at Cannes, The Hour of Liberation Has Arrived was banned in most of the Arab world for its socialist and feminist politics.

Srour was also vocal about the position of women in Arab society, and in 1978, along with Tunisian director Selma Baccar and Arab cinema historian Magda Wassef, she announced a new assistance fund "for the self-expression of women in cinema."

Her 1984 feature film, Leila and the Wolves, also reflects feminist politics. The film charts the story of Leila, a young Lebanese woman from London who travels through time through 20th-century Lebanon and Palestine. Srour's first feature film, Leila and the Wolves utilizes the art of documentary with the intricacies of Arabian mythology. Although fictional, she employs a symbolism that parallels an authentic narrative constructed from experience. Archival footage is woven into the composition to strategically emulate the complex, historical narratives. Further, Srour shares a feminist perspective that echoes the colonial past. In a 2019 interview with Mary Jirmanus Saba, Srour said "when I saw 8½, I realized that cinema was a very powerful medium that could express everything I wanted to say. But my main motivation in overcoming so many hurdles was feminist." Additionally, she invites audiences of every background and gender to deeply immerse themselves in the courageous events of the time, and aims to inspire other filmmakers to share their historically rich stories as well.

== Style and visual aesthetics ==
Srour is highly influenced by European art cinema, cinéma vérité, and anthropological filmmaking. She cites Federico Fellini's 8½ as a significant influence on her first film, The Hour of Liberation Has Arrived. Additionally, Srour started making films through her PhD program in social anthropology under French Marxist historian and sociologist, Maxime Rodinson, who greatly influenced her aesthetics and politics. She also cites Latin American Third Cinema as an important influence, namely, Octavio Getino’s The Hour of the Furnaces.

== Political views ==
Srour considers herself to be a feminist and a socialist. She also considers herself a "defeated feminist," directing her films towards “the Arab Left”, who “kept closing the subject” of feminism until “the main enemy, Imperialism, is defeated.” Additionally, Srour sought to address European anthropological filmmakers, who “were paternalistic with the so called primitive societies” and “often observed them like insects.” Instead, Srour hoped to depict the “so-called primitive societies” with greater nuance, showing how “the so-called underdeveloped people were more mature in terms of feminism and democracy than the citizens of industrial nations.”

Srour holds anti-Zionist views and sees herself as a Lebanese Arab before being Jewish.

== Awards and accolades ==
Srour was the first female Arab filmmaker to have a film, Saat El Tahrir Dakkat or The Hour of Liberation Has Arrived, considered for the Cannes Film Festival. Gleaning much of her stories from those of her ancestors, Srour often credits her grandmother for the success and recognition of her films.

In 2025, her films were showcased in restoration at the Brooklyn Academy of Music as part of a series highlighting her feminist revolutionary work. The series included Leila and the Wolves and The Hour of Liberation Has Arrived.

== Filmography ==
=== Short films and documentaries ===
- Bread Of Our Mountains (1968, 3 minutes)
- The Singing Sheikh (1991, 10 minutes, video)
- Rising Above – Women of Vietnam (1997) director and producer
- The Eyes of the Heart (1998, 52 minutes, video)
- Women of Vietnam (1998, 52 minutes, video)
- Woman Global Strike 2000 (2000, video)

=== Feature films ===
- The Hour of Liberation Has Arrived (1974, 62 minutes, 16mm) director, editor, and scriptwriter
- Dhofar/Omar – The Guerillas of the Arabian Gulf (1973)
- Leila and the Wolves (1984, 90 minutes, 16mm) director and scriptwriter
