= Dhofar Liberation Front =

Political front in Dhofar

- جبهة تحرير ظفار (Arabic)
- Other name: DLF
- Leaders: Musallam bin Nufl; Yusuf bin Alawi
- Founded: 26 December 1964
- Dates active: 1965–1968
- Active regions: Dhofar (Liberated Areas)
- Ideology: 1965-1967: Arab nationalism; Republicanism (Faction); Tribalism (Faction); Dhufarism (Faction); 1968: Scientific socialism
- Wars: Dhofar rebellion

Dhofar Liberation Front (DLF; Arabic: جبهة تحرير ظفار, romanized: Jabhat Taḥrīr Ẓufār) was a revolutionary organization that operated from 1965 to 1968 in Dhofar which was under the control of Muscat and Oman. Established on 26 December 1964 following the merger of the Dhufari Soldiers' Organization and the Dhofar Benevolent Society, its main aims were to end the rule of Sultan Said bin Taimur, and to end British imperial influence in the region. The front initiated the Dhofar rebellion in June 1965.

Initially an Arab nationalist and Dhufarist movement, the organization underwent an ideological shift toward Marxism–Leninism following the independence of South Yemen in 1967, eventually transforming into the Popular Front for the Liberation of the Occupied Arabian Gulf (PFLOAG) during the Hamrin Congress in 1968.

The two key leadership figures that would be at the core of the organization were Musallam bin Nufl and Yusuf bin Alawi. They began the Dhofar rebellion against the Sultanate of Muscat and Oman, and were supported by South Yemen after its independence in 1967. Almost all weapons were supplied through South Yemen, and many of the cadres went to China to study guerrilla warfare.

== History ==
=== Origins and formation ===
The DLF emerged from the convergence of several anti-colonial and reformist groups active in the early 1960s. The primary constituents were the Dhufari Soldiers' Organization (DSO), composed of Dhofari personnel serving in the armies of neighboring Gulf states (notably the Trucial Oman Scouts), and the Dhofar Benevolent Society (DBS), also known as the Dhufari Charitable Association (DCA). These groups were influenced by the Movement of Arab Nationalists (MAN), which began establishing secret cells in Salalah and Mirbat in 1964.

In late 1964 and early 1965, approximately 140 Dhofari fighters assembled in Basra, Iraq, before being moved to the Mansuriya camp near Baghdad for training in guerrilla warfare, explosives, and wireless communication. On 26 December 1964, the front was formally established to coordinate these various factions under a unified command.

=== Launch of the revolution ===
Arab People of Dhufar! A revolutionary vanguard has emerged from among you, believing in God and country, has taken upon itself the task of liberating this country from the rule of the despotic Al Bu Said Sultans, whose dynasty has been identified with the hordes of the British imperialist occupation. Brothers! This people has long and bitterly suffered from dispersion, unemployment, poverty, illiteracy, and disease - those pernicious weapons introduced under the protection of the bayonets of British Imperialism, and used against the Dhofaris by the government of the Sultans of Muscat.

— The first paragraph of the 9 June Declaration of Armed Struggle, which was announced by the Dhofar Liberation Front in 1965.

The DLF officially launched its armed struggle on 9 June 1965. A communiqué issued that day framed the revolution in the language of Arab nationalism, calling for the liberation of the people of Dhofar from the "tyrannical Al Bu Said Sultans" and their British backers. The movement initially relied on a "National Council" to direct operations, with leadership figures like Musallam bin Nufl representing the tribalist wing and Yusuf bin Alawi serving as a prominent representative abroad.

Early military actions were characterized by hit-and-run tactics in the wooded highlands (the Jebel), where the seasonal monsoon (the khareef) provided fog and cover for insurgent movements. One notable early engagement occurred on 8 November 1965, when a unit led by Masou’d Ja’boub (Khantour) attacked the fort at Mirbat.

=== Ideological shift and the Hamrin Congress ===
By 1967, the DLF was increasingly influenced by global revolutionary trends and the success of the National Liberation Front in neighboring South Yemen. Younger, radicalized cadres—many of whom had received training in China—began to challenge the older tribalist leadership. These elements, led by figures such as Ali Muhsin and Talal Sa’ad, criticized the DLF's initial regionalist focus as "spontaneous" and lacking a cohesive scientific theory.

The internal struggle culminated in the Hamrin Congress (September 1–20, 1968), held in Wadi Hamrin in central Dhofar. Attended by 65 delegates and Chinese observers, the congress adopted a new national charter based on scientific socialism and the Maoist theory of contradictions. The delegates voted to expand the scope of the revolution from Dhofar to the entire Arabian Gulf, leading to the rebranding of the organization as the Popular Front for the Liberation of the Occupied Arabian Gulf (PFLOAG).

== Ideology ==
The DLF was initially formed as a "united front" that was diverse anti-Sultanic interests, ranging from tribal leaders seeking autonomy to Arab nationalists inspired by Gamal Abdel Nasser. Its primary slogans emphasized liberation, republicanism, and the Arab identity of Dhofar.

Following the 1968 Hamrin Congress, the front's ideology shifted decisively toward Marxism–Leninism. The new charter identified the "principal contradiction" as being between the masses and "colonialist and reactionary authority." It committed the movement to "organized revolutionary violence" and social transformations, including the abolition of slavery, the suppression of tribalism, and the promotion of women's rights in liberated areas.

== Sources ==
- "The Struggle for Liberation in Oman". MERIP Reports (36): 10–27. 1975. doi:10.2307/3011444. ISSN 0047-7265. JSTOR 3011444.
- Takriti, Abdel Razzaq (August 25, 2016). Monsoon Revolution: Republicans, Sultans, and Empires in Oman, 1965-1976. Oxford University Press. ISBN 978-0-19-251561-2.
