= Hawf =

Coordinates: 16°35′N 52°50′E

Hawf حوف (Arabic)
- District
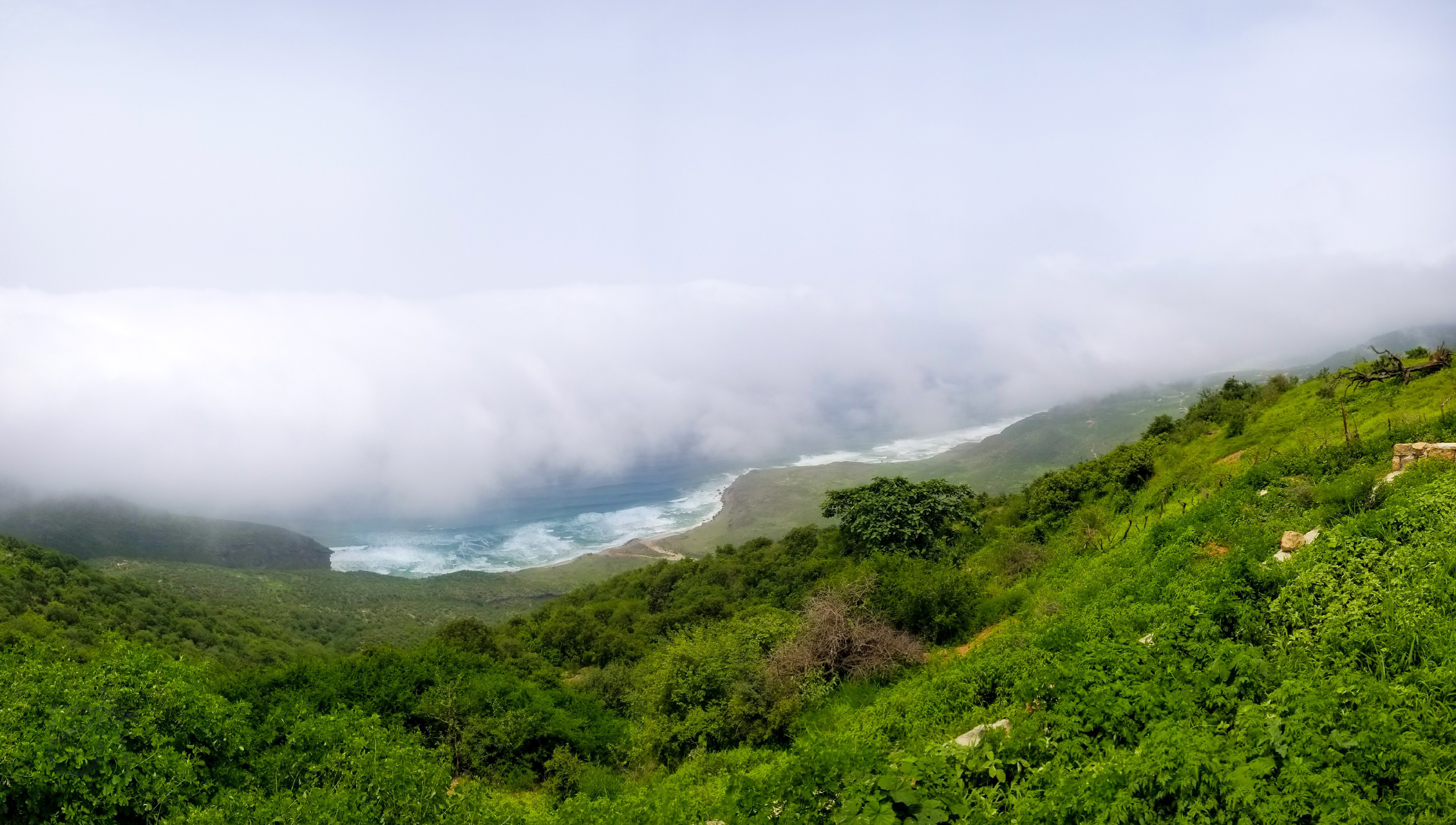
- View of the Hawf nature reserve
- Interactive map of Hawf
- Country: Yemen
- Governorate: Al Mahrah

Population (2004)
  - Total: 5,143
- Time zone: UTC+3 (Yemen Standard Time)

Hawf (Arabic: حوف), officially known as the Hawf District (Arabic: مديرية حوف), is a district of the Al Mahrah Governorate in south-eastern Yemen. As of the 2004 Yemeni census, the district had a population of 5,143 inhabitants. The Hawf Area was nominated as a natural UNESCO World Heritage Site in August 2002. Currently, it is listed as a tentative World Heritage Site. The town of Hawf itself is 12.7 kilometres (7.9 mi) southwest by road from Sarfait, and 163 kilometres (101 mi) southwest by road from Salalah, one of Oman's largest cities.

== Geography ==
The Hawf district is located in the Al Mahrah Governorate in south-eastern Yemen, situated between approximately 52°42' and 53°04' E longitude and 16°32' and 16°41' N latitude. Hawf itself is 12.7 kilometres (7.9 mi) southwest by road from Sarfait and 163 kilometres (101 mi) southwest by road from Salalah, Oman. Covering an area of 30,000 hectares, the district is characterized by rugged mountains that reach a maximum elevation of 1,400 meters above sea level. These mountains are oriented west to east, forming a natural barrier that separates the vast Rub' al Khali desert to the north from the Arabian Sea to the south. The range extends for approximately 60 kilometers, from Ras Fartak in the west to the border with Oman in the east.

Geologically, the mountains are predominantly limestone, with occasional granite outcrops visible on the surface. A dry plateau lies at the upper reaches of the mountains, and a narrower plateau traverses the range at an approximate elevation of 450 meters above sea level. The mountainous terrain is deeply incised by wadis, which can reach depths of 800 to 900 meters and dissect the range along most of its length. Inland, the mountains gradually transition into gravel hills and eventually into the desert, while towards the Arabian Sea, they form steep escarpments.

== Climate ==
In Hawf, the climate is hot and dry. Most rain falls in the winter. The Köppen-Geiger climate classification is Bwh. The average annual temperature in Hawf is 26.2 °C (79.2 °F). About 51 mm (2.01 in) of precipitation falls annually. According to UNESCO, the area in Hawf District, together with the Dhofar Governorate in the neighboring Oman, is important given its plant diversity. While most of the rest of the country is arid, Hawf is covered with trees and is home to several animal species. The expansion and intensification of agriculture threaten the area.

During the south-westerly monsoon season, from June to September, the steep coastal range frequently experiences cloud cover. The area receives approximately 500 mm of annual precipitation, with an additional potential of up to 1,000 mm from fog and cloud-derived moisture during the rainy season. However, precise rainfall data specifically for the Hawf region is not readily available. Temperatures are typically highest from mid-March to mid-June and lowest in January and February. These specific climatic conditions, particularly the relatively high precipitation, support a distinctive flora, including a dry deciduous monsoon forest that extends into Oman's neighboring Dhofar mountain range.

Climate data for Hawf
Month	Jan	Feb	Mar	Apr	May	Jun	Jul	Aug	Sep	Oct	Nov	Dec	Year
Mean daily maximum °C (°F)	27.4 (81.3)	27.9 (82.2)	30.4 (86.7)	32.6 (90.7)	34.4 (93.9)	34.6 (94.3)	31.7 (89.1)	31.2 (88.2)	31.9 (89.4)	31.6 (88.9)	30.5 (86.9)	28.2 (82.8)	31.0 (87.9)
Mean daily minimum °C (°F)	16.7 (62.1)	18.1 (64.6)	20.1 (68.2)	22.5 (72.5)	25.0 (77.0)	25.9 (78.6)	24.6 (76.3)	23.7 (74.7)	23.5 (74.3)	21.1 (70.0)	19.3 (66.7)	17.9 (64.2)	21.5 (70.8)
Average precipitation mm (inches)	4 (0.2)	3 (0.1)	4 (0.2)	10 (0.4)	1 (0.0)	2 (0.1)	7 (0.3)	8 (0.3)	1 (0.0)	2 (0.1)	4 (0.2)	5 (0.2)	51 (2.0)
Source: Climate-Data.org, Climate data

== Ecology ==
The Hawf region features an ecosystem shaped by its distinctive climatic conditions, particularly its significant levels of precipitation. This environment supports a relic dry deciduous monsoon forest that spans approximately 90 square kilometers in Yemen. The forest is primarily characterized by the Anogeissus dhofarica tree, often found alongside Jatropha and Commiphora species, and it is home to over 250 plant species. The area also hosts diverse wildlife, including around 65 bird species, more than 12 species of wild mammals, and various reptiles. Many naturally occurring wild herbivores and numerous carnivores are either at risk of extinction or have already become extinct.

In the coastal plains, common plant species include Adenium obesum, Calotropis procera, Ziziphus leucodermis, Grewia villosa, Euphorbia hadramautica, and Acacia tortilis. Further inland, at the base of the mountain escarpments, the vegetation is predominantly composed of xerophytic shrubs such as Commiphora spp., Grewia spp., Jatropha dhofarica, Croton confertus, and the succulent creeper Cissus quadrangularis. The wadis support riparian woodlands with species like Tamarindus indica, Ficus sycomorus, Ficus vasta, and Ficus lutea.

Above the 450-meter plateau, the semi-evergreen woodland increasingly features Anogeissus dhofarica, Ficus vasta, Ziziphus spina-christi, Acacia nilotica, Rhus somalensis, Commiphora spp., and Dodonaea angustifolia. A dense herbaceous layer, rich in legumes, grasses, and ferns, thrives beneath these species. Additionally, leguminous plants such as Cadia purpurea and Senna obtusifolia are also found, particularly in areas that were previously cleared for agriculture and later abandoned.

== Economy ==
The primary economic activity for the local population is livestock husbandry, accounting for 37% of livelihoods, followed by crop farming at 32%, and fishing at 29%. A study on the local population revealed that 53% of surveyed households primarily depended on agricultural activities for income. In the upper zone, agro-pastoral activities provided the main income for 80% of households, while in the lower zone, this was true for only 29.4%. Animal husbandry contributed the major share of on-farm income for 84% of interviewed households, with the remaining 16% earning more from crop production. Crop cultivation is largely subsistence-oriented, with produce only commercialized when there is a surplus or an urgent need for cash.

Beyond agro-pastoral activities, households engage in various off-farm economic pursuits. These include employment as teachers (53%), civil servants (20%), nurses (7%), and other forms of employment (13%), as well as commercial activities (7%). Short-term opportunities also contribute to monetary and non-monetary income. While surveyed households did not hire external labor for cropping, some residents in Jadeb employed shepherds for their goats. Additionally, the coastal settlements saw the employment of housemaids for cleaning duties.
