= Rakhyut =

- Wilayat
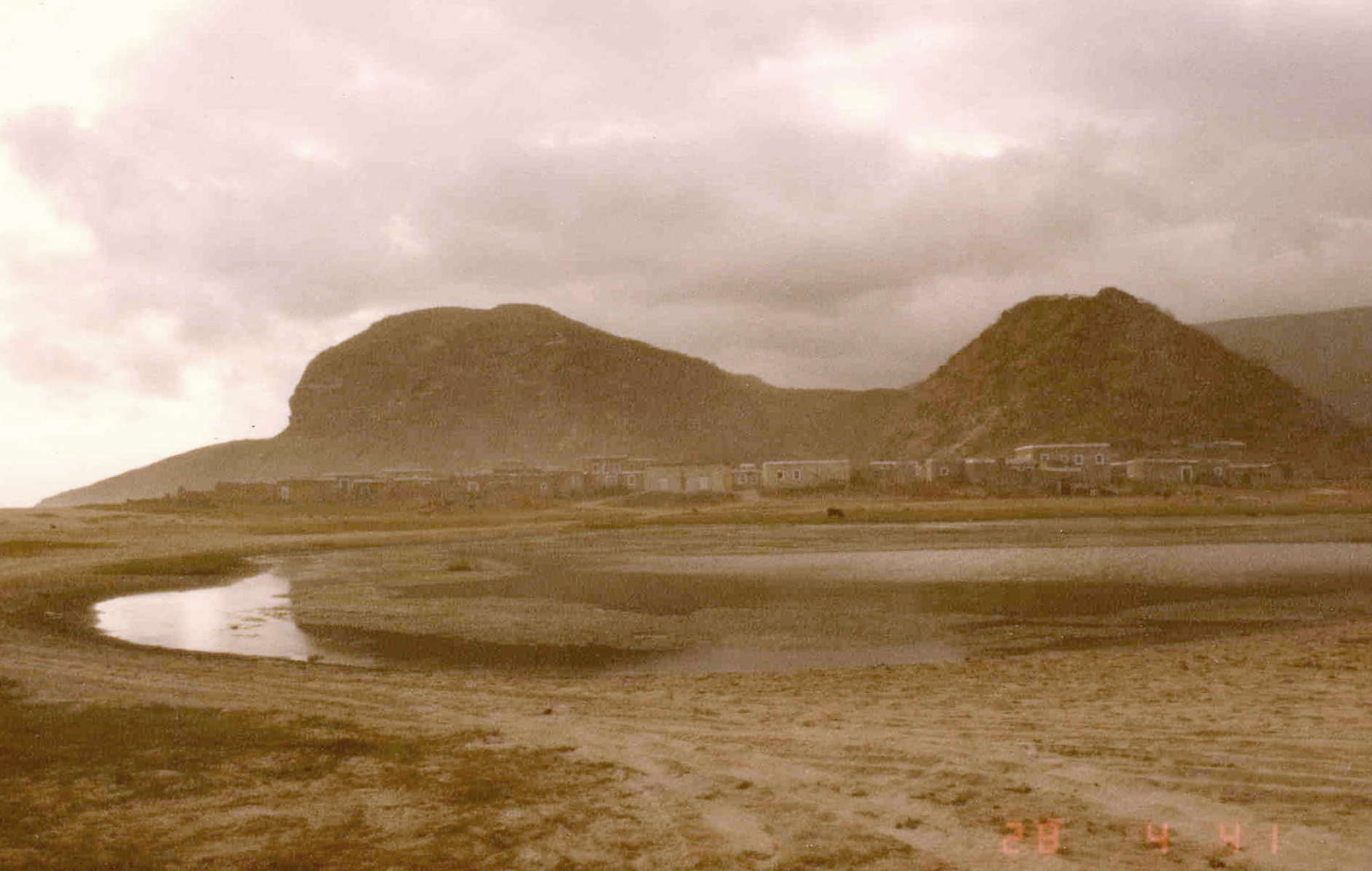
- Rakhyut in the 1980s

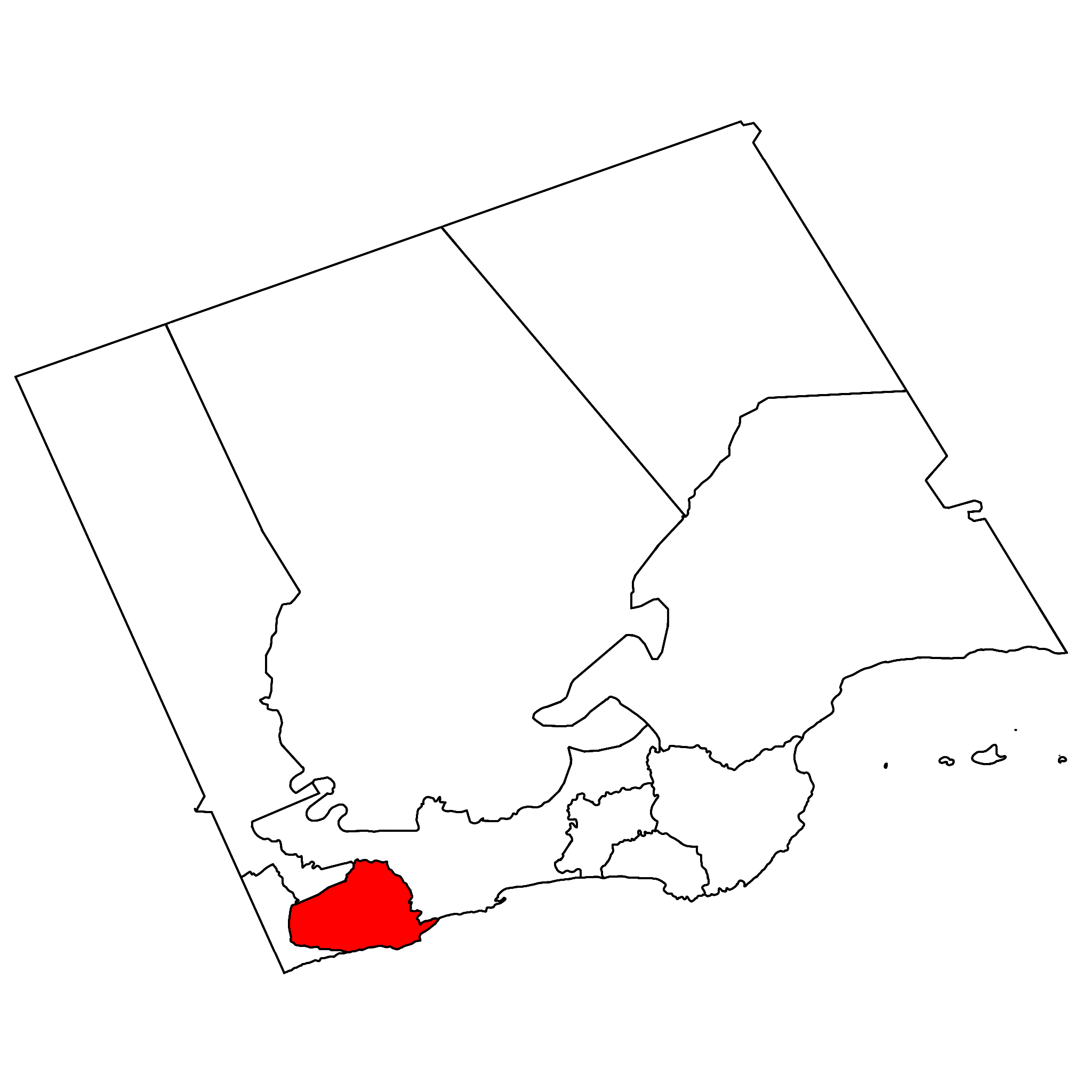
- Wilayat of Rakhyut in the Dhofar Governorate

- Location within Oman
- Coordinates: 16°45′N 53°25′E
- Country: Oman
- Governorate: Dhofar

Population (2020)
  - Total: 5,001

Rakhyut (Arabic: رخيوت, romanized: Rakhyūt) is a Wilayat or province of Dhofar Governorate in the Sultanate of Oman.

== History ==
In 1908, J.G. Lorimer recorded Rakhyut in his Gazetteer of the Persian Gulf, noting its location as being on the coast and roughly 13 miles west of Ras Sajar. He wrote:

A village of 60 or 70 mud houses inhabited by Qaras (Al-Hakli) of the Bait 'Ak'ak, Bait Hardan, Bait 'Isa and Bait Shamasah sections; it stands at the mouth of a ravine of the same name and is separated from Safqot to the east by a mountainous ridge scarped on the side towards the sea.

The village stands on the west side of a creek, on the opposite side of which is a tower built by the 'Omani Wali of Dhufar to keep off the attacks of hostile Mahras. Rakhyūt has increased considerably in the last 20 years in consequence of the expansion of the frankincense trade. Rakhyut is also called Qamar and occasionally Sa'duni from the name of a former chief.
