= Military ranks of Oman =

The Military ranks of Oman are the military insignia used by the Sultan of Oman's Armed Forces. Being a former British protectorate, Oman shares a rank structure similar to that of the United Kingdom.

== Commissioned officer ranks ==
The rank insignia of commissioned officers.

Rank group	General / flag officers					Senior officers			Junior officers
Royal Army of Oman
Royal Army of Oman	مشیر; Mushir	فريق أول; Fariq 'awal	فريق; Fariq	لواء; Liwa	عميد; Amid	عقيد; Aqid	مقدم; Muqaddam	رائد; Ra'id	نقيب; Naqib	ملازم أول; Mulazim awwal	ملازم; Mulazim
Royal Navy of Oman
Royal Navy of Oman	مشیر; Mushir	فريق أول; Fariq 'awal	فريق; Fariq	لواء; Liwa	عميد; Amid	عقيد; Aqid	مقدم; Muqaddam	رائد; Ra'id	نقيب; Naqib	ملازم أول; Mulazim awwal	ملازم; Mulazim
Royal Air Force of Oman
Royal Air Force of Oman	مشیر; Mushir	فريق أول; Fariq 'awal	فريق; Fariq	لواء; Liwa	عميد; Amid	عقيد; Aqid	مقدم; Muqaddam	رائد; Ra'id	نقيب; Naqib	ملازم أول; Mulazim awwal	ملازم; Mulazim
Royal Guard of Oman
Royal Guard of Oman				لواء; Liwa	عميد; Amid	عقيد; Aqid	مقدم; Muqaddam	رائد; Ra'id	نقيب; Naqib	ملازم أول; Mulazim awwal	ملازم; Mulazim
Sultan's Special Force
Sultan's Special Force				لواء; Liwa	عميد; Amid	عقيد; Aqid	مقدم; Muqaddam	رائد; Ra'id	نقيب; Naqib	ملازم أول; Mulazim awwal	ملازم; Mulazim
Rank group	General / flag officers					Senior officers			Junior officers

=== Student officer ranks ===
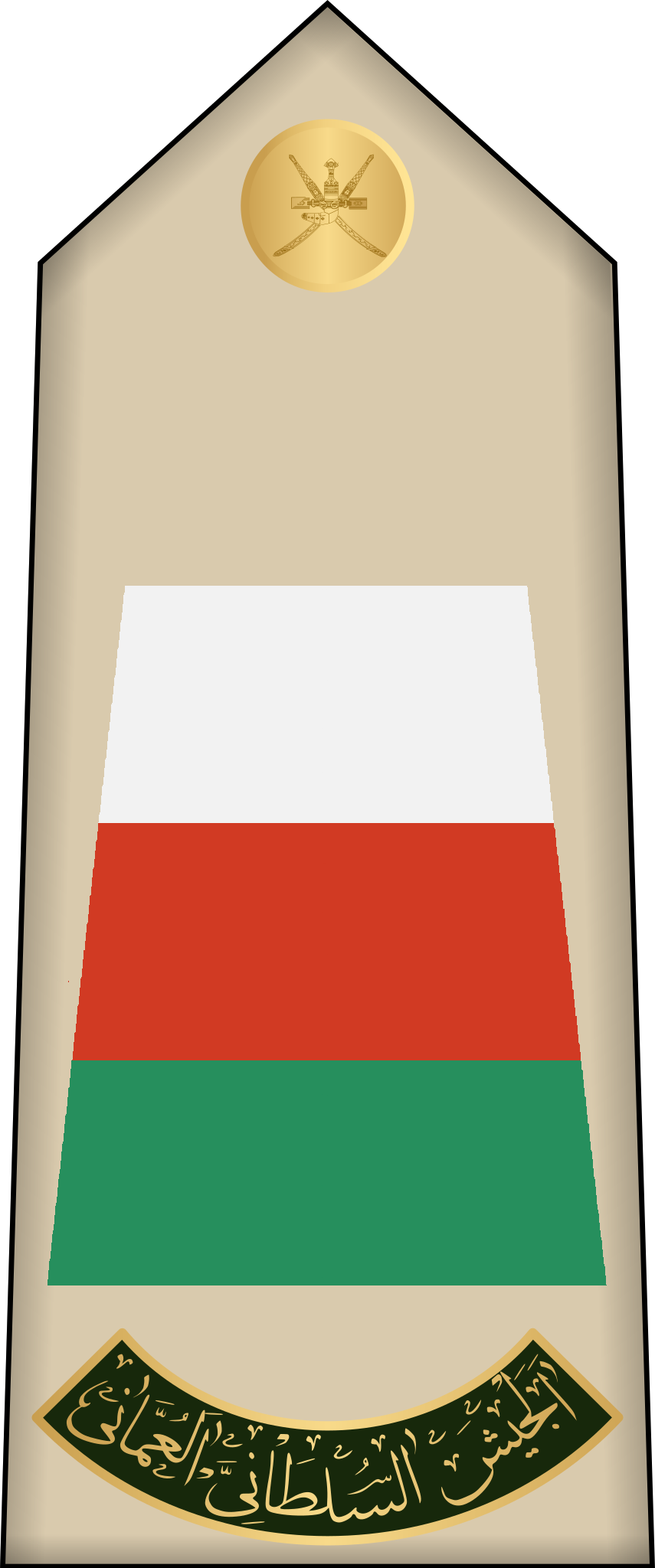
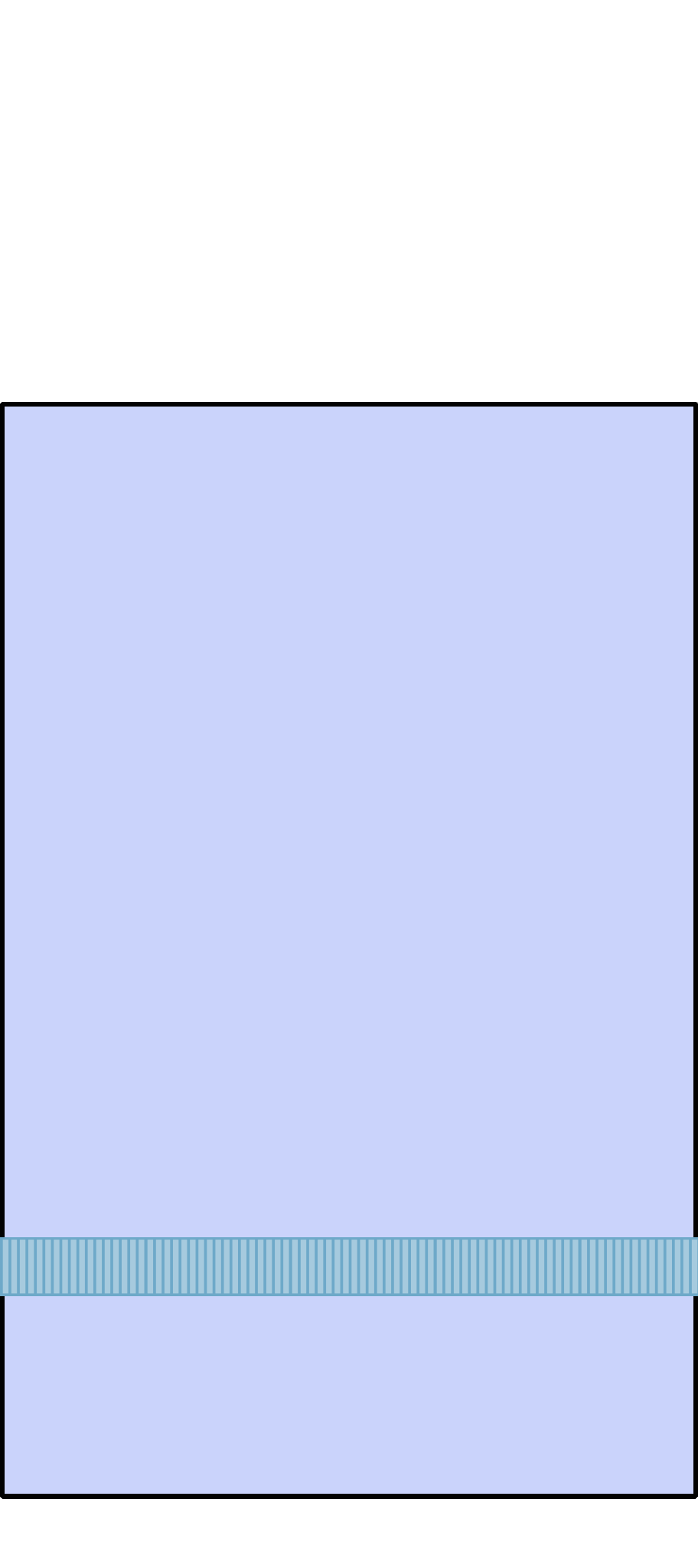
Rank group	Student officer
Royal Army of Oman
Royal Navy of Oman
Royal Air Force of Oman
Native name	ضابط مرشح; Dabit muraššaḥ

== Other ranks ==
The rank insignia of non-commissioned officers and enlisted personnel.

Rank group	Senior NCOs				Junior NCOs		Enlisted
Royal Army of Oman							No insignia
Royal Army of Oman	وکیل کتیبة; Wakil katiba	وکیل; Wakil	رقیب اول; Raqib 'awal	رقیب; Raqib	عریف; Earif	نائب عریف; Nayib earif	جندي; Jundiun
Royal Navy of Oman
Royal Navy of Oman	وكيل أول; Wakil 'awal	وكيل; Wakil	رقيب أول; Raqib 'awal	رقيب; Raqib	عريف; Earif	نائب عريف; Nayib earif
Royal Air Force of Oman							No insignia
Royal Air Force of Oman	وکیل کتیبة; Wakil katiba	وکیل; Wakil	رقیب اول; Raqib 'awal	رقیب; Raqib	عریف; Earif	نائب عریف; Nayib earif	جندي; Jundiun
Royal Guard of Oman							No insignia
Royal Guard of Oman	وکیل کتیبة; Wakil katiba	وکیل; Wakil	رقیب اول; Raqib 'awal	رقیب; Raqib	عریف; Earif	نائب عریف; Nayib earif	جندي; Jundiun
Sultan's Special Force							No insignia
Sultan's Special Force	وکیل کتیبة; Wakil katiba	وکیل; Wakil	رقیب اول; Raqib 'awal	رقیب; Raqib	عریف; Earif	نائب عریف; Nayib earif	جندي; Jundiun
Rank group	Senior NCOs				Junior NCOs		Enlisted
