= Jebel Regiment =

- Emblem of the Jebel Regiment
- Active: From 1970 to date
- Country: Oman
- Type: Infantry
- Role: Motorised infantry
- Size: One battalion
- Garrison/HQ: Nizwa, Oman
- Engagements: Dhofar War
- Decorations

The Jebel Regiment (JR) was formed in October 1970 and was one of the extra two properly constituted infantry regiments that Sultan Qaboos of Oman formed to augment the Omani Army in its operations in Dhofar. The regiment's crest is two crossed traditionally embossed Martini–Henry Rifles overlain vertically with a single traditional Khanjar dagger sheathed, with scrolls carrying the regimental title in Arabic. Members of the Regiment who served in Dhofar are entitled to wear the General Service Medal Oman, its ribbon design illustrated on the right (see Decorations).

== Unit history ==
The Sultanate of Oman (with Dhofar highlighted)

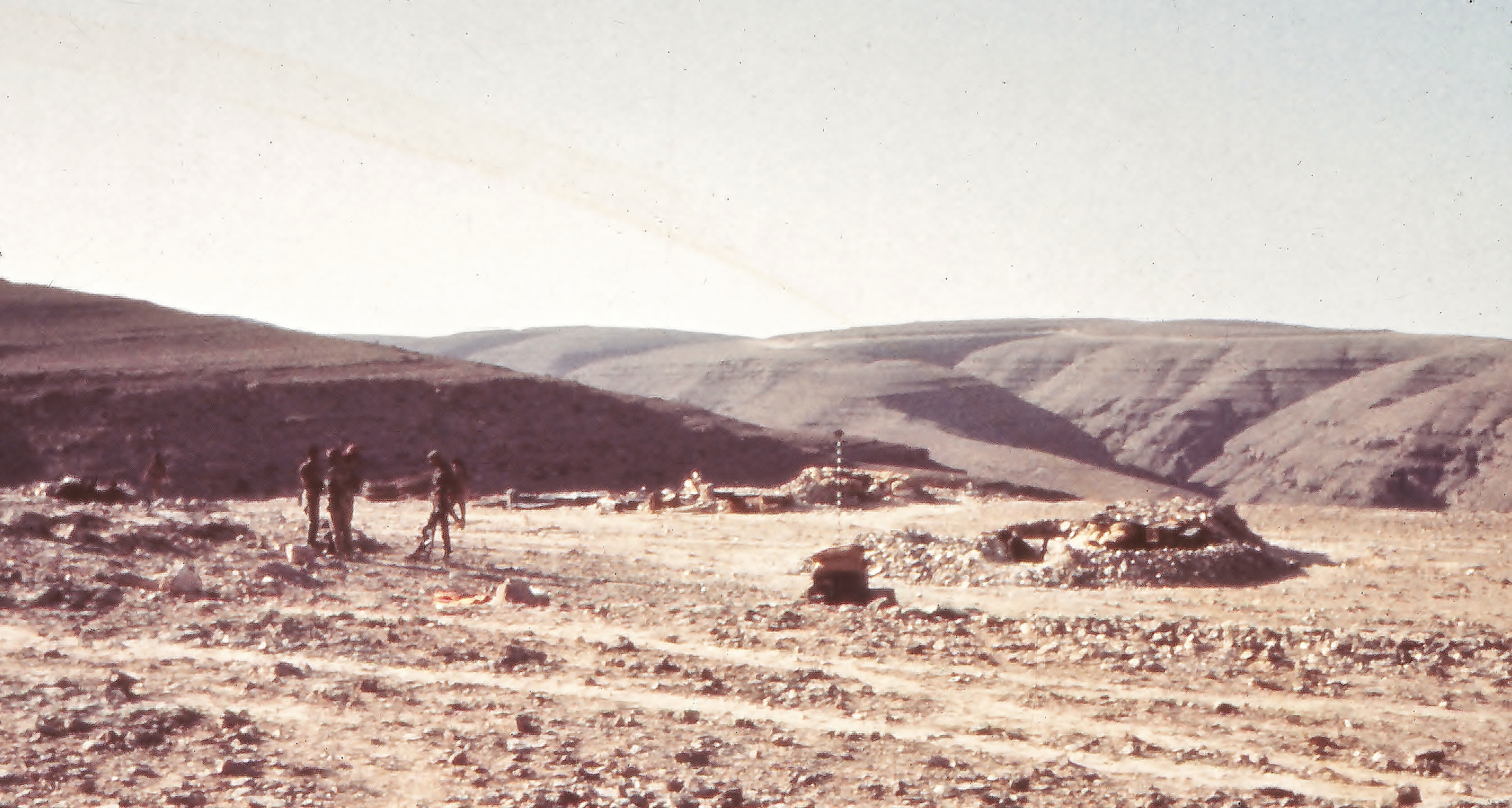
A Dhofar Brigade defensive position in 1972

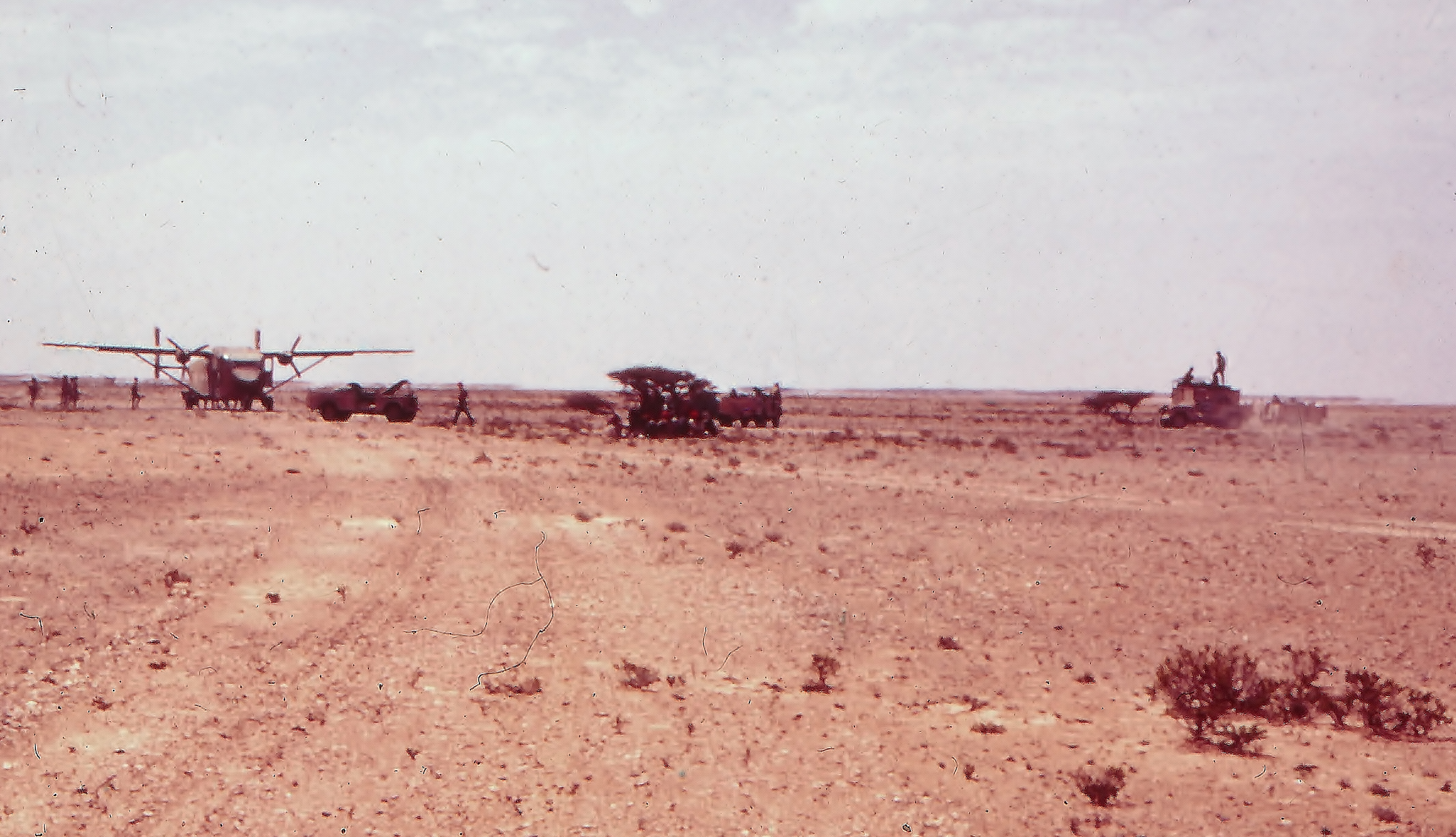
A Short SC.7 Skyvan resupplying Dhofar Brigade units in 1971

The unit would also see service in the Dhofar War along with other regiments of the Sultan's small army, which mostly supporting the Dhofar Brigade's operations in the 1970s fighting Communist insurgents in the south of the country, see map highlight.

The JR remains on the Order of Battle of the Royal Army of Oman and remains based in Nizwa.

== Roll of Honour ==
The following members of JR received gallantry awards:

- Major Phillip Stefan Wright - The Sultan's Distinguished Service Medal (Gallantry). Awarded posthumously, he was killed in action in 1973.
- Major David John MacRae Daniels - The Sultan's Distinguished Service Medal (Gallantry) in 1973.
- Major T P F Jones - The Sultan's Distinguished Service Medal (Gallantry)
- Captain G A Mathew - The Sultan's Distinguished Service Medal (Gallantry)
- Captain David John Noble McFadden - The Sultan's Distinguished Service Medal (Gallantry).

== Commanding officers ==
JR's Commanding officers have included:

- Lieutenant Colonel Peter Worthy
- Lieutenant Colonel Edward (Ted) Ashley

== See also ==
- Omani Civil War (1963-76)
- Sultan of Oman's Armed Forces
- Royal Army of Oman
- Sultan's Armed Forces Museum
