= RAFO Thumrait =

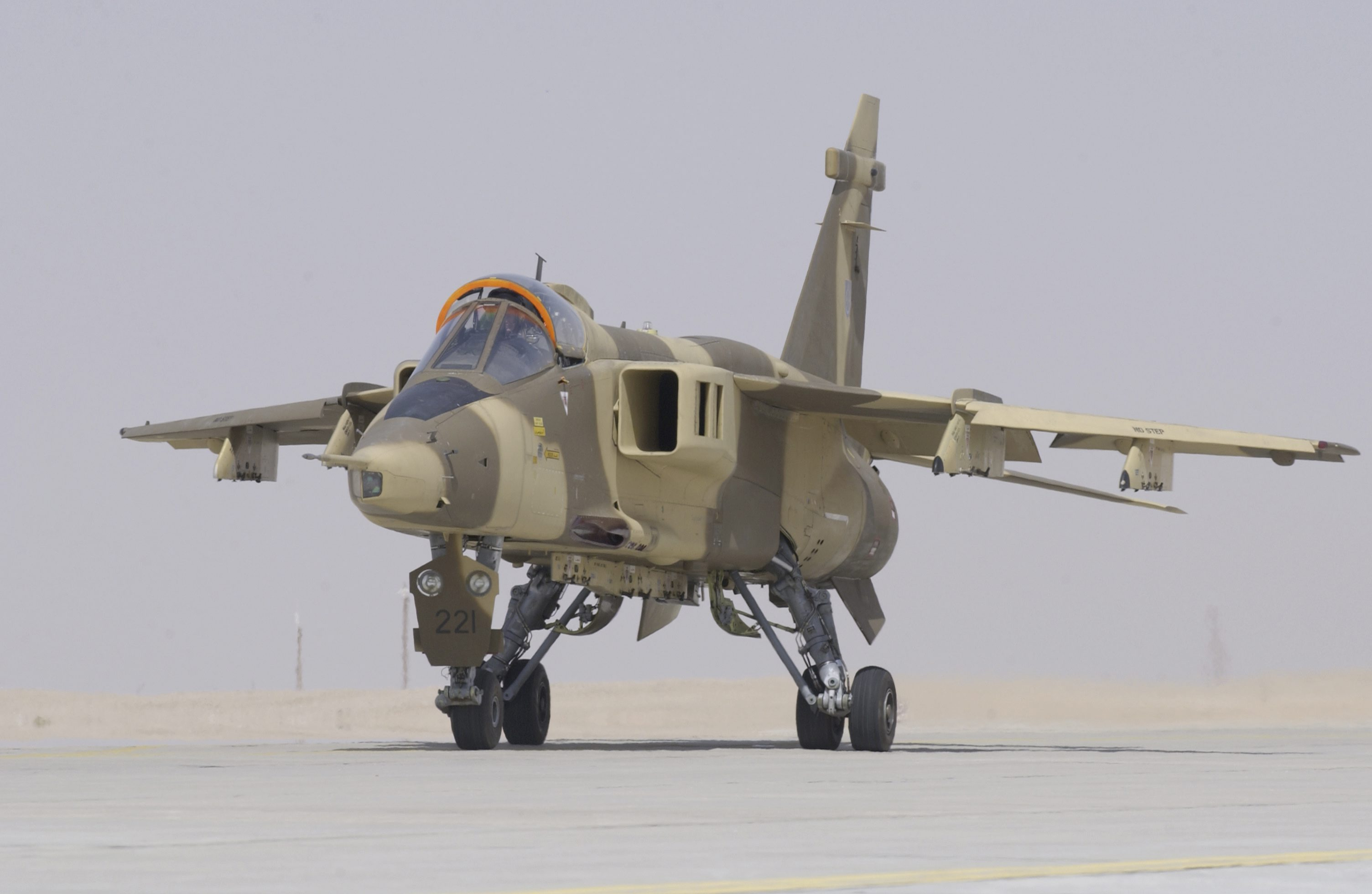
- IATA: TTH; ICAO: OOTH

Summary
- Airport type: Military
- Owner: Sultan of Oman's Armed Forces
- Operator: Royal Air Force of Oman
- Location: Thumrait, Dhofar Governorate, Oman
- Elevation AMSL: 1,526 ft (465 m)
- Coordinates: 17°39′57″N 054°01′28″E

Map
- Location of RAFO Thumrait in Oman

Runways
Direction	Length		Surface
Direction	m	ft	Surface
17/35	4,000	13,123	Asphalt

RAFO Thumrait airbase (IATA: TTH, ICAO: OOTH) is a military airfield located near Thumrait, a town in Dhofar Governorate, Oman. The Royal Air Force of Oman (RAFO) are the operators of RAFO Thumrait, and is home to two RAFO squadrons of F-16s. The United States Air Force (USAF) is a current tenant, and the British Royal Air Force (RAF) and the Indian Air Force (IAF) also use RAFO Thumrait during regular cross-nation military exercises.

== Facilities ==
RAFO Thumrait is at an elevation of 1,570 feet (479 metres) above mean sea level and has one runway (17/35) with an asphalt surface measuring 4,000 by 45 metres (13,123 by 148 feet).

== History ==
Originally an oil depot, RAFO Thumrait was established to project air power in that region of Oman. The first Omani air unit based at Thumrait, equipped with ex-RAF Hawker Hunter FGA.9 aircraft, was tasked with ground attack and intercept missions. Twelve new SEPECAT Jaguar fighter-bombers were added to the base's complement to improve attack capabilities in 1977.

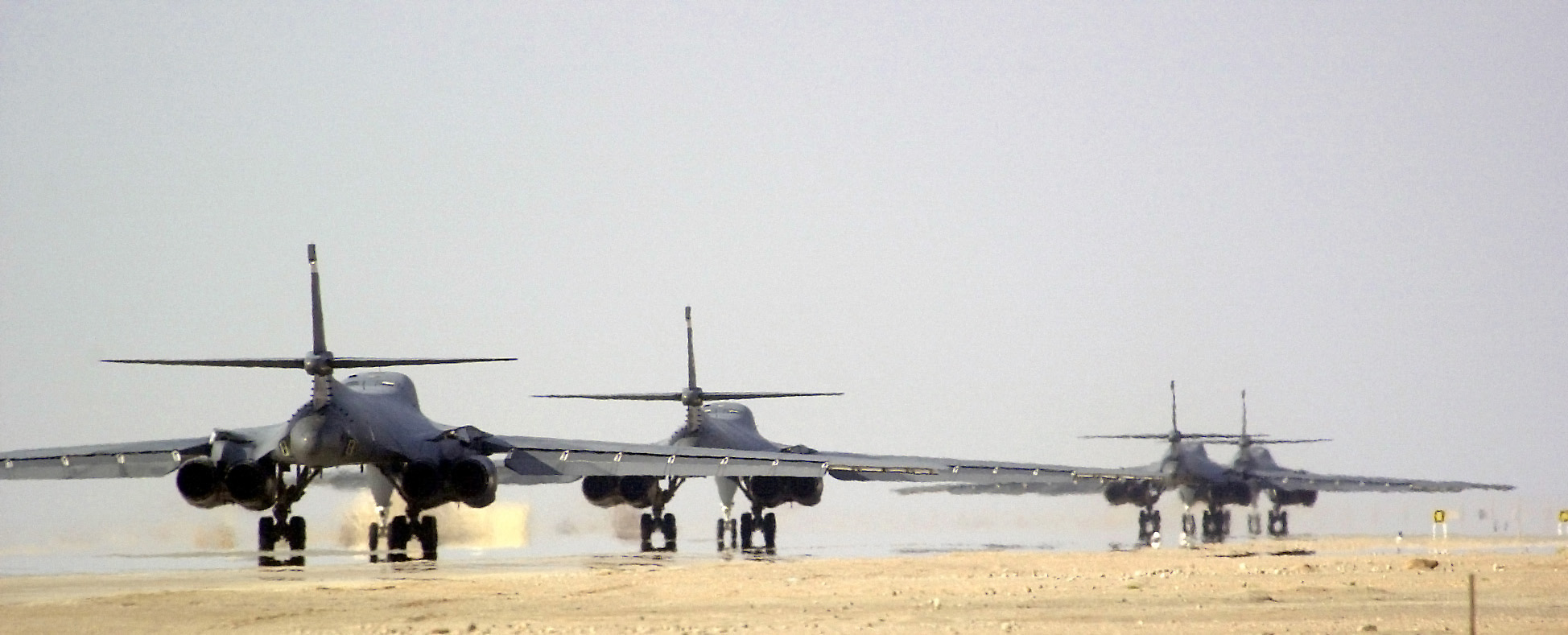
U.S. Air Force B-1B Lancers at RAFO Thumrait during Operation Enduring Freedom in 2002

RAFO Thumrait has been used by American, British, and allied air forces to support operations during operations Desert Shield, Desert Storm, Desert Fox, and the War in Afghanistan (2001-2021). Many current coalition detachments now operate from Muscat International Airport, which is closer to the area of operations.

"Thumrait.. is a Harvest Falcon depot. Harvest Falcon is the Air Force's transportable system of modular personnel tents, shelters, equipment, and vehicles to be used when there are infrastructure limitations. The Harvest Falcon equipment is an 1,100-person housekeeping set of tents, electrical generators and billets."

A US Air Force War Reserve Materiel (WRM) contract was let to DynCorp Technical Services to provide support for bare base systems, medical, munitions, fuels mobility support equipment, vehicles, rations, aerospace ground equipment, air base operability equipment, and associated spares and other consumables at Royal Air Force of Oman (RAFO) airbase, Thumrait. These services include maintaining war reserve materiel (WRM) stored at Thumrait.

== Exercises held at RAFO Thumrait ==
The US Air Force's 16th Special Operations Wing, 823rd 'Red Horse' Squadron went to RAFO Thumrait on 17 April 1996 for 'Eastern Castle', an exercise with the Omani military. During this exercise, the US Air Force built runway and apron extensions, and installed overhead lighting in the base's aircraft hangars.

=== Saif Sareea ===
Exercise Saif Sareea (Swift Sword} are a series of military exercises between Her Majesty's (UK) Armed Forces and His Majesty the Sultan of Oman's Armed Forces. First held in 1987, Saif Sareea is one of several major training exercises held approximately every four years; to deploy, sustain, exercise and recover a medium-scale war-fighting Joint Task Force at strategic distance into a key strategic area and demonstrate the Joint Rapid Reaction Force (J-RRF) concept.

Saif Sareea 2 (Swift Sword 2) was the second iteration, held in Oman between September and November 2001. It involved a combination of His Majesty the Sultan of Oman's Armed Forces and Her Majesty's (UK) Armed Forces; with naval, ground and air activities.

On 2 October 2018, the first four of eight Typhoon FGR4 fighter jets II (Army Co-operation) Squadron travelled to RAFO Thumrait from their home base of RAF Lossiemouth in Scotland for Saif Sareea 3. This time, as part of 140 Expeditionary Air Wing (140 EAW), the Typhoons will be supported by an E-3D Sentry AEW1, operated by 8 Squadron, normally based at RAF Waddington in England. According to the official Royal Air Force website, "The Typhoons will fly alongside the Royal Air Force of Oman's F-16 aircraft during the largest tri-service, bilateral, interoperability exercise in the region for almost two decades". Other RAF elements at Thumrait in support of SS3 was 1 Squadron RAF Regiment.

=== Eastern Bridge ===
In 2009, Indian Air Force pilots of 'Flaming Arrows' and 'Cobras', two SEPECAT Jaguar Squadrons, participated in joint exercises called 'Eastern Bridge', alongside the Royal Air Force of Oman (RAFO)'s force of SEPECAT Jaguars and F-16 Fighting Falcons at RAFO Thumrait. Another Indo-Omani exercise, 'Eastern Bridge-II', took place in 2011 at Indian Air Force Station Jamnagar (Gujarat).
