= Erik Bennett (RAF officer) =

British adviser to Sultan of Oman (1925–2022)

Air Marshal Sir Erik Bennett KBE CB CVO
- Born: 3 September 1928
- Died: 28 January 2022 (aged 93)
- Military career
- Allegiance: Ireland, United Kingdom, Oman
- Branch: Royal Air Force, Sultan of Oman's Air Force
- Service years: 1948–1991
- Rank: Air Marshal
- Service number: 1906354
- Commands: Principal Adviser Sultan Qaboos bin Said Al Said(1992-2020); Commander of Sultan of Oman's Air Force (1974-1990); Officer in command RAF Boulmer(1973)
- Conflicts: Dhofar War
- Awards: Royal Victorian Order; Companions of the Order of the Bath

Air Marshal Sir Erik Peter Bennett, KBE, CB, CVO (3 September 1928 – 28 January 2022) was an Irish Royal Air Force officer who subsequently became Commander of the Sultan of Oman's Air Force and an adviser to Sultan Qaboos bin Said Al Said.

== Early life ==
Bennett was born on 3 September 1928, in County Laois, Ireland, and educated at The King's Hospital school in Dublin. Late of Glebe House, Donaghmore, Co. Laois.

== Royal Air Force ==
Bennett was commissioned as a Pilot Officer (emergency) in the RAF on 22 January 1948, rising from a leading aircraftman. He was promoted to Flying Officer on 22 January 1950 and made Flight Lieutenant on 13 June 1953. On 1 January 1954 he was awarded the Queen's Commendation for Valuable Service in the Air.

He became a Squadron Leader on 1 January 1959 and rose to Wing Commander on 1 July 1965. He was promoted to Group Captain on 1 July 1971. According to the Daily Telegraph, Bennett served as an air adviser to King Hussein of Jordan in the early 1970s. Alan Duncan says Bennett was picked for this role by Conservative minister Julian Amery.

== Sultan of Oman's Air Force ==
In May 1973, as officer in command of RAF Boulmer, Bennett led a British military team on a visit to Oman, where he wrote a proposal for an Omani air defence system. Bennett reportedly became commander of the Sultan of Oman's Air Force in 1974, during the Dhofar Rebellion, and held this position until 1990. He appears to have remained in the British RAF throughout this assignment.

By December 1975, Bennett was ranked as an Air Commodore and had apologised in November that year for "disobeying orders" when he wrongly authorised a British military pilot on loan to Oman to fly a sortie 100 km over the border into South Yemen. The pilot, Squadron leader Robin Renton, had undertaken photographic reconnaissance of Al Ghaydah Airport in an Omani Hawker Hunter jet which developed "engine seizure" on the return journey, forcing him to eject and sustain spinal injury. Other sources say Renton was shot down by anti-aircraft guns.

The incident caused some tension between Bennett and Kenneth Perkins, Commander Sultan of Oman's Armed Force. Perkins claimed Bennett was "too close" to Sultan Qaboos. Britain's ambassador to Oman, Charles James Treadwell, said removing Bennett from Oman ahead of schedule would "certainly meet with the Sultan's resistance and in the end do us more harm than good. It should not be forgotten that it is extremely difficult for Perkins to have as Commander of his air wing an officer who is as much a political animal, using his access to and influence with the Sultan, as an experienced technical administrative officer."

Bennett stayed in Oman and was made a Companion of the Order of the Bath by the Queen on 16 June 1984 when he was listed as Air Vice-Marshal. He was knighted by the Queen on 16 June 1990 in her "overseas awards". Bennett retired from Britain's RAF on 10 June 1991, with his rank listed as Air Marshal, although subsequent listings in official records described him as an Air Vice-Marshal.

== Adviser to Sultan Qaboos ==
Bennett continued working in Oman after retiring from military service and became the principal adviser to Sultan Qaboos in 1992. In September 1995 Bennett was injured in a car crash while travelling with Sultan Qaboos. A senior Omani minister, Qais al-Zawawi, was killed in the accident, but Bennett recovered in hospital. Journalist Marie Colvin described Bennett as "one of Oman's (and Britain's) best-kept secrets: the key figure in a group of elderly former military and intelligence officers who help the Sultan to run his rich, strategically vital country at the mouth of the Gulf." Bennett attended the funeral of former British Conservative minister Julian Amery in December 1996.

Bennett organised the annual meeting of the Sultan's Privy Council, where British dignitaries would advise Qaboos on policy issues such as economic reform, security and foreign policy.

On 16 May 2007, Bennett had lunch with Air Chief Marshal Sir Jock Stirrup, who was Chief of the Defence Staff at the UK's Ministry of Defence. On 22 February 2010, Bennett attended a service of thanksgiving for the life of Major General Kenneth Perkins on behalf of The Sultan of Oman, at St Luke's Church in Chelsea. The King of Jordan was also represented at the service.

In November 2010, while on a Royal visit to Muscat, the Queen awarded Bennett the Insignia of a Commander of the Royal Victorian Order and later that same day "invested The Sultan of Oman with the Royal Victorian Chain." On 15 June 2012, Bennett was listed an "adviser to The Sultan" when he attended a lunch with Sultan Qaboos and the Queen at Buckingham Palace, together with Foreign Secretary William Hague MP. Bennett was one of more than 800 guests approved by Margaret Thatcher to attend her funeral in 2013.

On 12 January 2016, Bennett was visited in Oman by Sir Christopher Geidt, the Queen's Private Secretary. On 12 April 2016, Bennett had lunch with Sir Alan Duncan in London. On 7 January 2017, Bennett attended the Sultan's Privy Council. On 22 September 2017, Bennett had lunch with Sir Alan Duncan in Rutland. Bennett attended the Sultan's Privy Council on 6 January 2018 and 5 January 2019.

== Personal life and death ==
Bennett suffered from a fall in 2019 and recovered by late April. He died on 28 January 2022, at the age of 93.
