= General Perkins =

General Perkins may refer to:

- David G. Perkins (born 1957), U.S. Army four-star general
- Ken Perkins (1926–2009), British Army major general
- Simon Perkins (1771–1844), Ohio Militia brigadier general in the War of 1812
