= Rabkut =

Rabkut ربكوت Rabkot
- Village
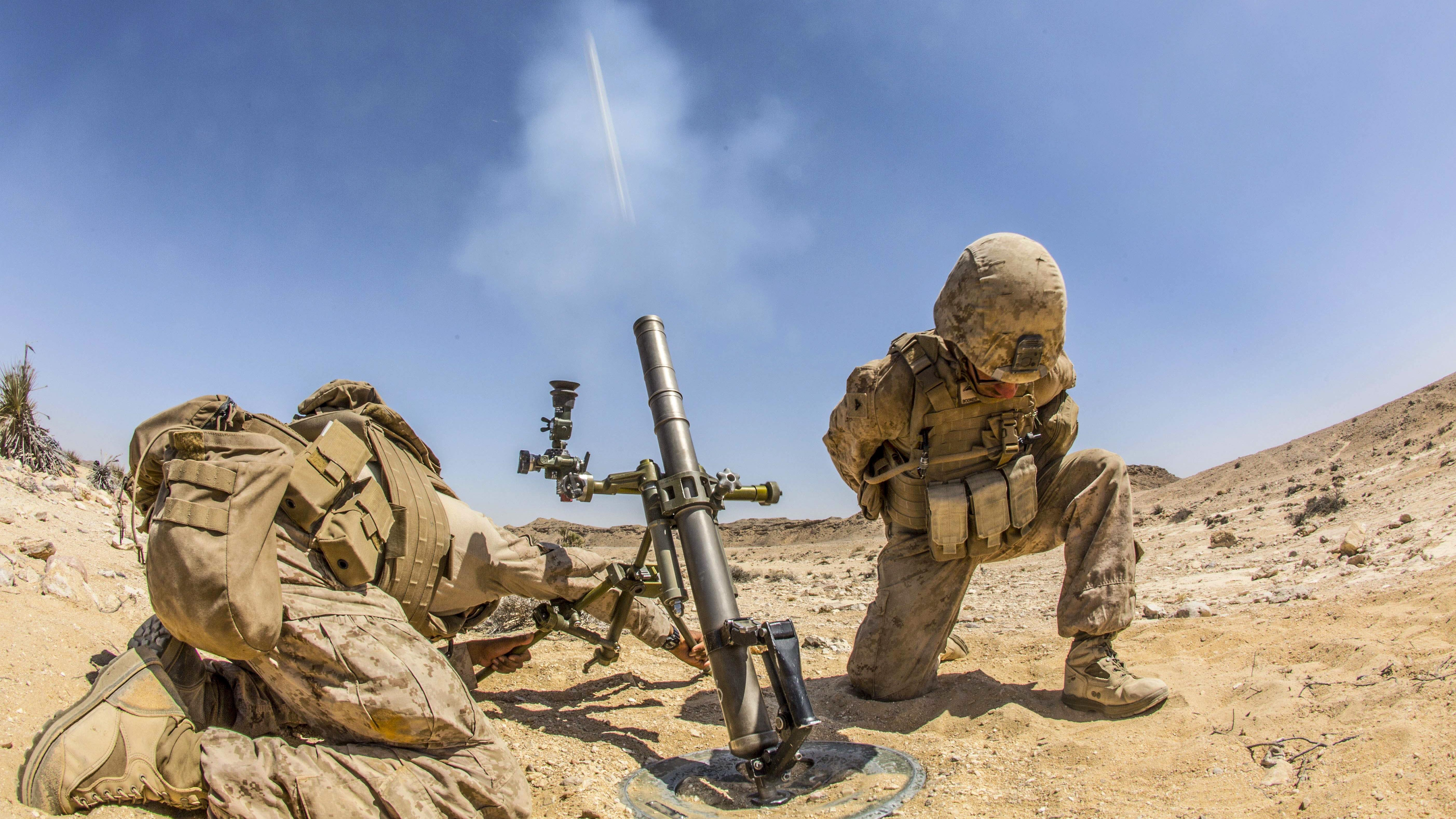
- U.S. Marines firing a mortar as part of a military exercise with Omani soldiers in Rabkut.

- Location in Oman
- Coordinates: 17°28′19″N 54°07′32″E
- Country: Oman
- Governorate: Dhofar Governorate
- Wilayat (province): Thumrait

Area
  - Total: 14.95 km^{2} (5.77 sq mi)
  - Land: 14.95 km^{2} (5.77 sq mi)
  - Water: 0 km^{2} (0 sq mi)
- Elevation: 525 m (1,722 ft)

Population (2020)
  - Total: 931
  - Density: 62.29/km^{2} (161.3/sq mi)
- Time zone: UTC+4 (Oman Standard Time)

Rabkut (Arabic: ربكوت) is a village in Thumrait, Dhofar Governorate, in southwestern Oman. In 2020, it had a population of 931. It has been the site of Exercise Sea Soldier, an annual military exercise conducted to keep regional stability, in addition to showing the cooperative skills of the United States with other countries. Exercises include counter-improvised explosive device training, live-fire ranges, operations on urban terrain, and building clearing among others.

== Demographics ==
Historical population of Rabkut
Year	Pop.	±%
2003	316	—
2010	505	+59.8%
2020	931	+84.4%

According to the 2020 census, there were 505 males (54.5%) and 424 females (45.5%). 806 people (86.6%) had Omani citizenship. 359 people (59%) were ages 0-14, 549 (59%) were 15-64, and 23 (2.5%) were 65+.
