= Royal Army of Oman =

Land warfare branch of Oman's military

- قوات السلطان المسلحة
- Founded: 1907
- Country: Oman
- Allegiance: Sultan of Oman
- Type: Land force
- Role: Land warfare
- Size: 25,000 (2024)
- Garrison/HQ: Muaskar al Murtafaa
- Engagements: Dhofar rebellion; 2026 Iran war
- Website: Royal Army of Oman

Commanders
- Supreme Commander: Sultan Haitham bin Tariq
- Minister of Defense: Shihab bin Tariq Al Said
- Armed Forces Chief of Staff: Vice Adm. Abdullah bin Khamis bin Abdullah Al Raisi
- Commander of the RAO: Major Gen. Matar bin Salim bin Rashid al Balushi

Insignia
- Flag of Royal Army of Oman

The Royal Army of Oman (Arabic: الجيش العماني, romanized: al-Jaīsh al-'Umānī) is the ground forces component of the Sultan of Oman's Armed Forces. It was founded in 1907 as the Muscat Garrison. It has a current strength of up to 25,000 active personnel.

== History ==
Oman has a military history which dates back to the seventh century, when troops from the Alozd tribe were strong enough to help Abu Bakr, companion of the Islamic prophet Mohammed. At the beginning of the seventeenth century there were local forces associated with Ya'ariba dynasty. It was this dynasty, which forced the expulsion of Portuguese from the country in 1650. The Ya'ariba dynasty were responsible for most of the fortified site across what is now the Sultanate of Oman from Musandam in the north to the southern province of Dhofar.

The Royal Army of Oman officially traces its origins back to the formation of the Muscat Garrison in 1907, this local garrison force was developed and became the Muscat Infantry in 1921. An agreement between the Omani and the British governments in 1958 led to the creation of the Sultan's Armed Forces (SAF) and the creation of formally structured Omani army units. At the same time the United Kingdom promised to provide direct assistance in the development of the SAF and its land forces. During the 1960 and 1970s, army units fought in the Dhofar Rebellion alongside British units and it relied on embedded unit-level British military advisors, who saw combat alongside the units they were very much part of. At the end of the Dhofar Rebellion the Omani army became an independent service known as the Sultan of Oman Land Forces in 1976. In 1990, Sultan Qaboos bin Said al Said renamed his land forces the Royal Army of Oman (RAO). The RAO frequently exercises with the armed forces of fellow Gulf Cooperation Council nations and other strategic defense partners such as the US and UK.

== Ground Forces Organisation ==
According to the latest MoD Telephone Directory published by Omantel, RAO is structured as follows:

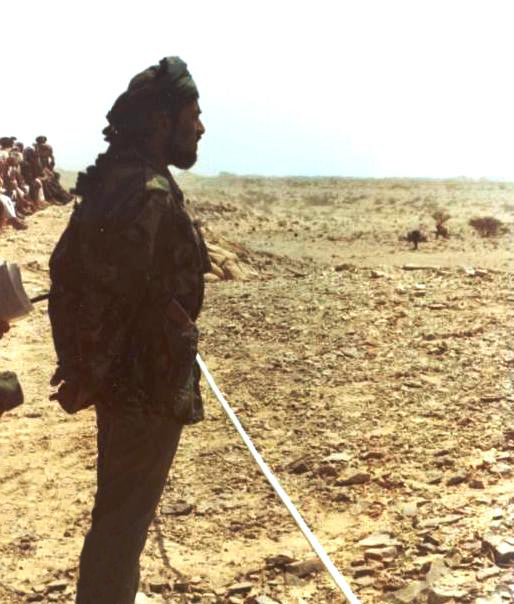
Sultan Qaboos in the field observing an army exercise in 1980

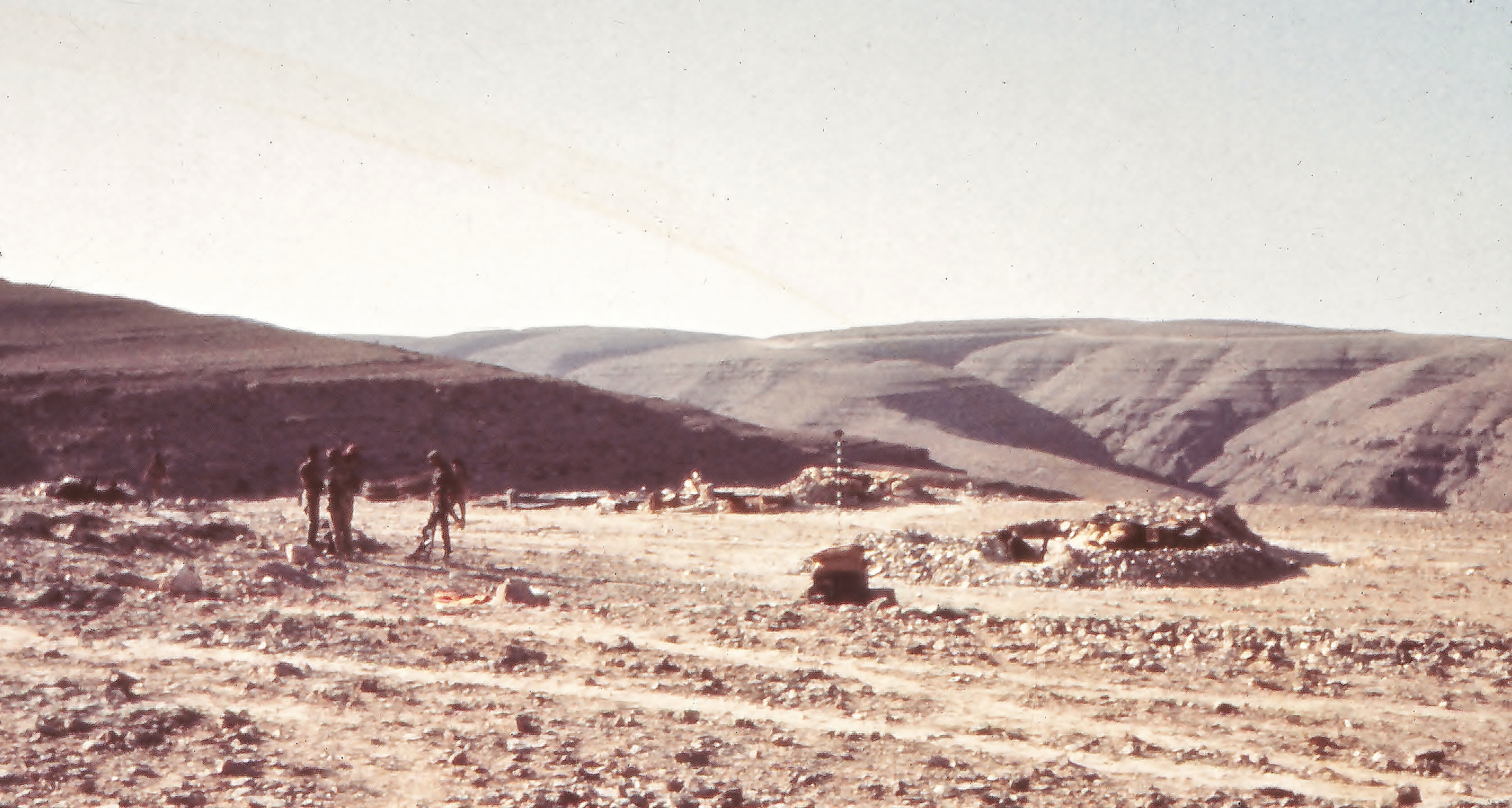
Omani Army positions at Sarfayt in 1972, during the Dhofar Rebellion

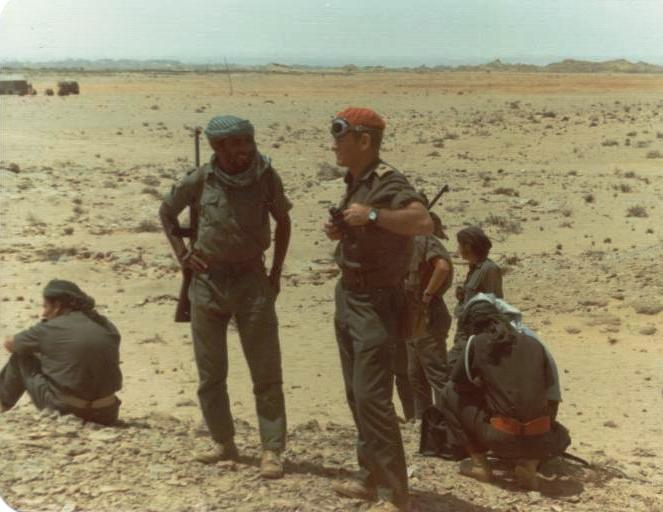
A British military advisor with Omani soldiers in 1980

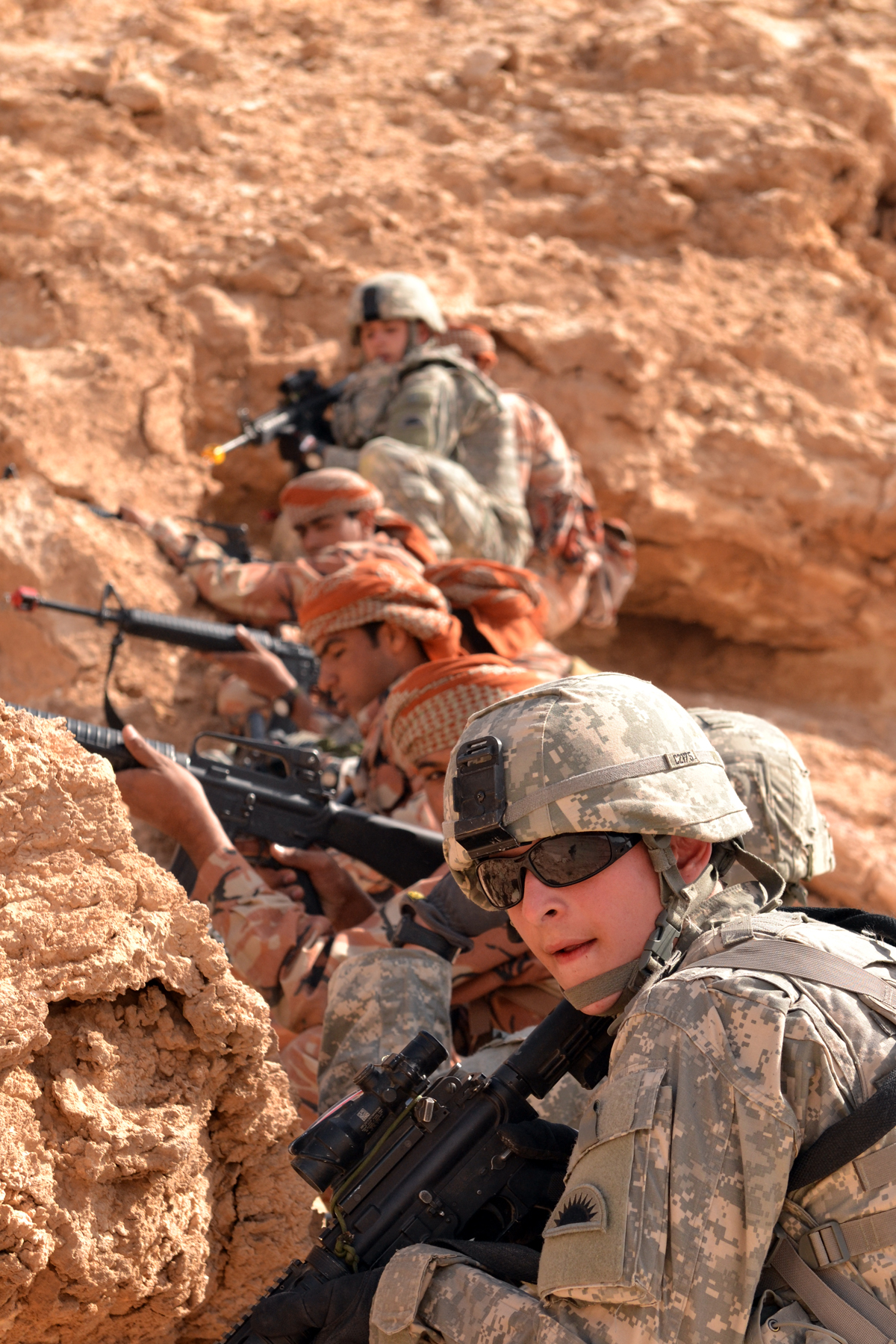
Oregon National Guard Training in Oman alongside the Omani Army (U.S. Army Photo by Spc. Cory Grogan, Oregon Military Department Public Affairs)

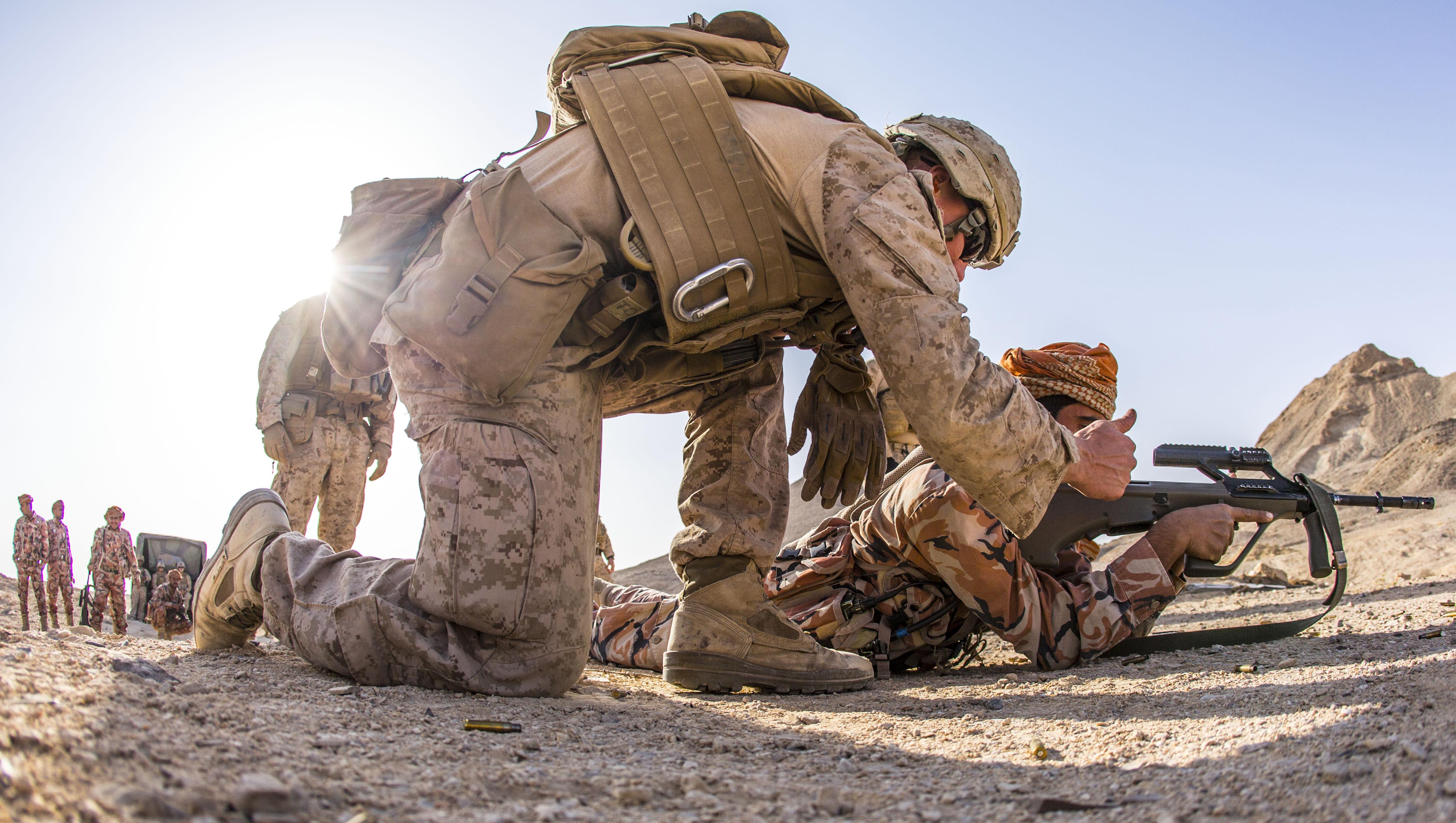
Omani soldiers and US Marines exercising in 2017

- HQ RAO at Muaskar al Murtafa'a (MAM) near Seeb
- Two infantry brigades:
  - 11 Brigade (the southern brigade) based in Salalah
  - 23 Brigade (the northern brigade) based at MAM
- The Sultan's Armour Units (MSO) based at Sultan bin Safy Camp at Shafa, near Izki
  - Two regiments of main battle tanks (Challenger 2 and M60A3)
  - Medium Reconnaissance Regiment (FV101 Scorpion)
- The Border Guard Brigade with a base in Haima in the Al Wusta Governate
- Infantry
  - Muscat Regiment (MR) based at Bidbid - Mowag Piranha-equipped Mechanised Infantry
  - Northern Frontier Regiment (NFR) based at Ibri and Buraimi
  - Desert Regiment (DR) based at Ibra - Mowag Piranha-equipped Mechanised Infantry
  - Jebel Regiment (JR) based at Nizwa
  - Southern Regiment (KJ) one battalion based at Salalah near the Royal Palace on the Taqah Road
  - Western Frontier Regiment (WFR) based at Thumrait
  - Sultan of Oman's Parachute Regiment (SOPR) based at Rustaq
  - Oman Reconnaissance Regiment based in Dhofar
- Border and Local Security Forces (light infantry role)
  - Western Border Security Force based at Al Qabil
  - Coastal Security Force based at Sur
  - Musandam Security Force (MSF) based at Bukha
  - Rural Security Forces based in Salalah (replaced Firqat Forces)
- Sultan of Oman's Artillery
  - Northern artillery units based at Izki
  - Southern artillery units based at Thumrait in Dhofar
- SAF Signals based in MAM (with units supporting 11 Brigade)
- SAF Engineers based in MAM (with units supporting 11 Brigade)
- SAF Transport based in Mabela (with units supporting 11 Brigade)
- SAF Electrical & Mechanical Engineers based in MAM (with units supporting 11 Brigade)
- SAF Ordnance based in MAM (with units supporting 11 Brigade)
- SAF Medical Services main hospitals at Al Khoudh (north) and Umm al Ghawarif (south) and other base locations
- Training Establishments
  - National Defence College Bayt al Falaj, Ruwi, Muscat
  - Military Technical College near Seeb Airport
  - Sultan Qaboos Military College (KSQA) including the RAO Officer Training School based at Aydem in Dhofar
  - Sultan Armed Forces Training Regiment
  - Battle Training Centre - Saiq, Jebel al Akhdhar

== Garrison locations ==
Based on locational evidence given in Omantel telephone directory listings (telephone number associations), historical recollections of British servicemen and analysis of Google Earth and Google Map imagery and cartographic data the following RAO garrisons have been identified:

| Name | Wilayat | Province | Type | Unit association | Geographic coordinates (lat/long) |
Headquarters locations
| Muaskar Bayt al Falaj | Bayt al Falaj | Muscat | Headquarters and unit accommodation | Office of the Minister Responsible For Defense Affairs | 23.610051N 58.544752E |
| Muaskar al Murtafa'a | Al Seeb | Muscat | Headquarters and unit accommodation | HQ COSSAF, HQ RAO, HQ 23 Brigade | 23.572877N 58.250439E |
| Umm al Ghawarif Barracks | Salalah | Dhofar | Headquarters and unit accommodation | HQ 11 Brigade and Base Hospital | 17.027473N 54.137078E |
| Haima Barracks | Haima | Al Wusta | Headquarters and unit accommodation | HQ Border Guard Force Brigade and force units | 19.998067N 56.358130E |
Combat unit locations
| Shafa Barracks | Shafa | Al Dakhiliyah | Multiple armoured units and support units | Sultan of Oman's Armour | 22.733322N 57.718340E |
| Izki Barracks | Izki | Al Dakhiliyah | Multiple artillery units and support units | Sultan of Oman's Artillery | 22.954081N 57.775505E |
| Bukha Barracks | Bukha | Musandam | Light infantry unit location | Musandam Security Force | 26.144753N 56.143521E |
| Rustaq Barracks | Rustaq | Al Batinah South | Light infantry unit location | Sultan of Oman's Parachute Regiment | 23.411183N 57.429730E |
| Bidbid Barracks | Bidbid | Al Dakhiliyah | Infantry unit location | Muscat Regiment | 23.438529N 58.126797E |
| Ibri Barracks | Ibri | Al Dhahirah | Infantry unit location | Northern Frontier Regiment | 23.241060N 56.512264E |
| Buraimi Fort and Barracks | Buraimi | Buraimi | Infantry unit location | Northern Frontier Regiment | 24.236837N 55.790218E |
| Al Qabil Barracks | Al Qabil | Buraimi | Light infantry unit location | Western Border Security Force | 23.933569N 55.823533E |
| Nizwa Barracks | Nizwa | Al Dakhiliyah | Infantry unit location | Jebel Regiment | 22.917048N 57.537668E |
| Ibra Barracks | Ibra | Al Sharqiyah North | Infantry unit location | Desert Regiment | 22.738625N 58.505236E |
| Sur Barracks | Sur | Al Sharqiyah South | Light infantry unit location | Coastal Security Force | 22.538349N 59.476562E |
| Bait al Maamoorah Palace Barracks | Salalah | Dhofar | Infantry unit location | Southern Oman Regiment | 17.046984N 54.219079E |
| Raysut Barracks | Salalah | Dhofar | Infantry unit location | Oman Reconnaissance Regiment | 16.946844N 53.995651E |
| Thumrait Barracks | Thumrait | Dhofar | Infantry unit location | Western Frontier Regiment | 17.642156N 54.020499E |
| Mayzunah Barracks | Mayzunah | Dhofar | Infantry unit location | Western Frontier Regiment | 17.856471N 52.692569E |
| Sarfayt Base | Sarfayt | Dhofar | Infantry unit location | Southern Border Security Force | 16.697399N 53.103528E |
Support unit locations
| Mabela Camp | Al Seeb | Muscat | Transport unit accommodation | Sultan's Armed Forces Transport Regiment | 23.666388N 58.140895E |
| Armed Forces Hospital | Al Khoudh | Muscat | Base Hospital | Sultan's Armed Forces Medical Services | 23.574647N 58.207412E |
Training locations
| National Defense College | Bayt al Falaj | Muscat | Higher Defense Staff College | SAF training site | 23.607289N 58.543684E |
| Aydem Camp | Aydem | Dhofar | Sultan Qaboos Military College | Officer and NCO Training Academy | 16.990236N 53.358888E |
| Saiq Camp | Saiq, Jebel Akhdar | Al Dakhiliyah | Infantry training Area | RAO training site | 23.074098N 57.639172E |
| Military Technical College | Seeb | Muscat | Military College | SAF training site | 23.568452N 58.278716E |
Cultural and welfare locations
| Armed Forces Museum | Bayt al Falaj | Muscat | Historic site and display of military artifacts | Defense Museum | 23.608479N 58.545949E |
| Armed Forces Beach Club | Seeb | Muscat | Restaurants, vacation accommodation and function rooms | SAF Welfare | 23.605869N 58.330261E |

== Equipment ==
In 2020, Oman spent 11% of GDP on military expenditures.

Oman has one armored brigade (MSO) equipped with the Challenger 2 and the M60A1 and M60A3 tanks.

Between 2001 and 2004 Oman received 174 amphibious light armored vehicles and more than 80 armored VBL from France.

In 2010, Oman started using the INSAS rifles as the official standard rifle, as per a defence agreement signed in 2003 between India and Oman. These rifles have since been replaced and kept in storage.

In May 2013 the United States announced a deal with Oman valued at $2.1 billion to supply a ground-based air defense system.

172 FNSS Pars armoured combat vehicle were ordered for delivery from 2017, with the total amount reaching $500 million.

Oman was reportedly looking to acquire K2 main battle tanks from South Korea. South Korean Defense Company Hyundai Rotem Co. could sell 76 K2 Black Panther Main Battle Tanks to Oman, a deal that could reach an amount up to $884.6 million.

=== Small arms ===
| Name | Image | Caliber | Type | Origin | Notes |
Pistol
| Browning Hi-Power | | 9×19mm | Semi-automatic pistol | Belgium | |
Submachine guns
| Sterling L2A3 | | 9×19mm | SMG | United Kingdom | |
| Heckler & Koch MP7 | | 4.6×30mm | SMG; PDW | Germany | |
Rifles
| M16A1 | | 5.56×45 mm | Assault rifle | United States | |
| M4 | | 5.56×45mm | Carbine; Assault rifle | United States | |
| Carbon 15 | | 5.56×45mm | Carbine; Assault rifle | United States | |
| SIG Sauer SIGM400 | | 5.56×45mm | Semi-automatic rifle Assault rifle | United States | |
| Steyr AUG | | 5.56×45mm | Bullpup; Assault rifle | Austria | |
| FN FAL | | 7.62×51mm | Battle rifle | Belgium | |
| SIG SG 540 | | 7.62×51mm | Battle rifle | Switzerland | |
| SKS | | 7.62×39mm | Semi-automatic rifle | Soviet Union | Mostly limited to use as a ceremonial weapon |
| Lee-Enfield | | .303 British | Bolt-action rifle | United Kingdom | Mostly limited to use as a ceremonial weapon |
Sniper and anti-materiel rifles
| Barrett M82 | | .50 BMG | AMR | United States | |
Machine guns
| FN MAG | | 7.62×51mm | GPMG | Belgium | |
| Browning M2 | | .50 BMG | HMG | United States | |
Rocket propelled grenade launchers
| LAW 80 | | 94mm | RPG | United Kingdom | |
Grenade launchers
| M203 | | 40×46mm SR | Grenade launcher | United States | |
| M79 | | 40×46mm | Grenade launcher | United States | |

=== Anti-tank weapons ===
| Name | Image | Type | Origin | Caliber | Notes |
|---|---|---|---|---|---|
| MILAN | | ATGM | France; Germany | | 370 in service |
| BGM-71 TOW | | ATGM | United States | | 44 in service |
| FGM-148 Javelin | | ATGM | United States | | 30 in service |

=== Vehicles ===
==== Tanks ====
| Name | Image | Type | Origin | Quantity | Notes |
|---|---|---|---|---|---|
| Challenger 2 | | MBT | United Kingdom | 38 | |
| FV4201 Chieftain | | MBT | United Kingdom | 27 | Delivered by United Kingdom from 1981 to 1985 |
| M60A1/A3 | | MBT | United States | 79 | 6 M60A1; 73 M60A3 |
| FV101 Scorpion | | Light tank | United Kingdom | 120 | |

==== Reconnaissance ====
| Name | Image | Type | Origin | Quantity | Notes |
|---|---|---|---|---|---|
| B1 Centauro | | Tank destroyer | Italy | 9 | With 120mm gun |

==== Reconnaissance ====
| Name | Image | Type | Origin | Quantity | Notes |
|---|---|---|---|---|---|
| FNSS Pars | | AFV | Turkey | 172 | Delivered by Turkey from 2017 to 2020 |
| Mowag Piranha II | | AFV | United Kingdom; Switzerland | 174 | |

==== Scout cars ====
| Name | Image | Type | Origin | Quantity | Notes |
|---|---|---|---|---|---|
| Panhard VBL | | Scout car | France | 124 | 8 equipped with BGM-71 TOW |

==== Armored personnel carriers ====
| Name | Image | Type | Origin | Quantity | Notes |
|---|---|---|---|---|---|
| Cadillac V-100 | | APC | United States | 15 | |
| Fahd | | APC | Egypt; Germany | 31 | |
| AT105 Saxon | | APC | United Kingdom | 15 | |
| VAB | | APC | France | 56 | 4x4 & 6x6 version, 6 VAB-VCI, and 8 VAB-VTT |
| WZ-551 | | APC | China | 50 | |
| FV103 Spartan | | APC | United Kingdom | 34 | |

==== Engineering vehicles ====
| Name | Image | Type | Origin | Quantity | Notes |
|---|---|---|---|---|---|
| CRARRV | | ARV | United Kingdom | 4 | |
| M728 CEV | | CEV | United States | 3 | |
| FV106 Samson | | ARV | United Kingdom | 3 | |

==== Utility vehicles ====
| Name | Image | Type | Origin | Quantity | Notes |
|---|---|---|---|---|---|
| Humvee | | LUV | United States | Unknown | Vehicles sold via the U.S. Foreign Military Sales program |
| URO VAMTAC | | LUV | Spain | Unknown | |
| Land Rover Defender | | Utility vehicle | United Kingdom | Unknown | |
| Steyr-Puch Pinzgauer | | Utility vehicle | Switzerland | Unknown | |
| KrAZ-255 | | Utility truck | Soviet Union | Unknown | |

=== Artillery ===
| Name | Image | Type | Origin | Quantity | Notes |
Self-propelled artillery
| M109A0 | | Self-propelled artillery | United States | 15 | |
| G6 Rhino | | Self-propelled artillery | South Africa | 24 | |
Field artillery
| M-46 | | Field gun | Soviet Union; China | 24 | 12 M-46; 12 Type 59–1 |
| L118 | | Field gun | United Kingdom | 42 | |
| D-30 | | Howitzer | Soviet Union | 30 | |
| FH70 | | Howitzer | Germany; United Kingdom | 12 | |
| M102 | | Howitzer | United States | 36 | |
Mortar carriers
| 2R2M | | Mortar carrier | France | 6 | Based on VAB 6×6 chassic |
Mortars
| L16 | | Mortar | United Kingdom | 69 | |
| M30 | | Mortar | United States | 20 | |
| Brandt АМ-50 | | Mortar | France | 12 | |

=== Air defense ===
==== Man-portable air-defense systems ====
| Name | Image | Type | Origin | Quantity | Notes |
|---|---|---|---|---|---|
| 9K32 Strela-2 | | MANPADS | Soviet Union | | |
| Blowpipe | | MANPADS | United Kingdom | | |
| Javelin | | MANPADS | United Kingdom | 34 | Delivered by United Kingdom from 1984 |

==== Towed anti-aircraft guns ====
| Name | Image | Type | Origin | Quantity | Notes |
|---|---|---|---|---|---|
| ZU-23-2 | | Autocannon | Soviet Union | 4 | |
| Bofors L/60 | | Autocannon | Sweden | 12 | |
| Oerlikon GDF | | Autocannon | Switzerland | 10 | |

==== Self-propelled anti-aircraft guns ====
| Name | Image | Type | Origin | Quantity | Notes |
|---|---|---|---|---|---|
| 96K6 Pantsir-S1E | | SPAAG | Russia | 12 | Based on MAN SX chassic |

==== Surface-to-air missile systems ====
| Name | Image | Type | Origin | Quantity | Notes |
|---|---|---|---|---|---|
| Rapier | | SAM | United Kingdom | 28 | 600 Rapier-1+ 800 Rapier-2 missiles |
| Crotale NG | | SAM | France | Unknown | |
| Mistral | | SHORAD | France | 54 | |
| NASAMS | | SAM | Norway; United States | Unknown | |
| FV4333 Stormer HVM | | SAM | United Kingdom | 4 | |

=== Historical equipment ===
==== Sidearms ====
- United Kingdom: Enfield No. 2

==== Rifles ====
- Soviet Union: AK
- India: INSAS (Former Standard Rifle)

==== Tanks ====
- Soviet Union: 6 T-72S

==== Reconnaissance ====
- France: 6 VBC-90

==== Armored personnel carriers ====
- United Kingdom: 38 Alvis Saladin
- United Kingdom: 17 FV105 Sultan

==== Utility vehicles ====
- Germany: Volkswagen Iltis

==== Field artillery ====
- United States: M116
- United Kingdom: BL 5.5
- United Kingdom: 40 QF-25 Pounder
