= Sultan's Armed Forces =

Combined military of Oman

- القوات المسلحة لسلطان عمان
- The Seal of the Sultan's Armed Forces
- Motto: God - Homeland - The Sultan
- Founded: 1907
- Service branches: Royal Army of Oman; Royal Air Force of Oman; Royal Navy of Oman; Royal Guard of Oman; Sultan's Special Force
- Headquarters: Bayt al Falaj, Muscat

Leadership
- Supreme Commander-in-Chief: Sultan Haitham bin Tariq Al Said
- Minister of Defense: Shihab bin Tariq Al Said
- Chief of Staff: Vice Admiral Abdullah bin Khamis bin Abdullah Al Raisi

Personnel
- Conscription: No
- Active personnel: 42,600
- Reserve personnel: 100,000

Expenditure
- Budget: US$8.686 billion (2017)
- Percent of GDP: 12.1% (2017)

Industry
- Domestic suppliers: Oman Engineering Company

Related articles
- Ranks: Military ranks of Oman

The Sultan's Armed Forces (SAF; Arabic: القوات المسلحة السلطانية) are the military of Oman. They constitute the Royal Air Force of Oman, Royal Army of Oman, Royal Guard of Oman, Royal Navy of Oman and the Sultan's Special Force.

== History ==
=== Buraimi dispute ===
Prior to 1954, when Said bin Taimur became ruler of Muscat and Oman, the defense of the region was guaranteed by treaties with the British Empire. The only armed forces in Muscat and Oman were tribal levies and a palace guard recruited from Baluchistan in Pakistan (due to a historical quirk by which the Sultan also owned the port of Gwadur). Prior to that year, there had been a dispute with Saudi Arabia over the ownership of the Buraimi Oasis, which was important for oil exploration rights.

For many centuries, the interior of Oman had been an autonomous region, the Imamate of Oman. The Imam of Oman was its religious and secular leader. In 1954, the Imam was Ghalib bin Ali. He had been prepared to muster Omani tribesmen to expel the Saudis from Buraimi, but at British instigation, the matter was settled by arbitration. To prevent the Imam interfering with the settlement over Buraimi, a battalion-sized task force, the Muscat and Oman Field Force was raised, and occupied the town of Ibri. The Sultan's prestige and authority was damaged by his disdain for his own people.

At this point, the SAF consisted of:

Batinah Force (an infantry unit raised from the coastal region north of Muscat)
Muscat Regiment (the expanded former Palace Guard).
Muscat and Oman Field Force

Some British officers were attached to each unit.

=== Jebel Akhdar campaigns ===
With the Field Force occupying part of his territory, Ghalib tried to declare the Imamate of Oman independent, but in December 1955 the Field Force captured Ghalib at the town of Rostaq. He was released on recognisances.

==== Rebellion in 1957 ====
Talib bin Ali, the Imam's brother, had fled to Saudi Arabia. He returned from there in 1957 with 300 well-equipped fighters, and the insurrection broke out again. Talib's forces occupied a fortified tower near Bilad Sait, which the Field Force lacked the heavy weapons to destroy. After some weeks' inconclusive fighting, Suleiman bin Himyar, the Sheikh of one of the major tribes in the interior, openly proclaimed his defiance of the Sultan, and began a general uprising. The Muscat and Oman Field Force was largely destroyed as it tried to retreat through hostile towns and villages.

The rebellion was suppressed by the Muscat Regiment and the Trucial Oman Levies from the neighbouring United Arab Emirates. The decisive factor however, was the intervention of infantry (two companies of the Cameronians) and armoured car detachments from the British Army and aircraft of the RAF. Talib's forces retreated to the inaccessible Jebel Akhdar. The SAF's attacks up the few paths up the Jebel were easily repelled.

==== Stalemate 1957–1959 ====
The Sultan's army was reorganised under a British soldier, Colonel David Smiley. The Batinah Force was renamed the Northern Frontier Regiment and the remnants of the Muscat and Oman Field Force merged into the new Oman Regiment. Within each unit and sub-unit, Baluchi and Arab soldiers were mixed. This prevented units defecting to or openly sympathising with the rebels, but led to tensions within units, and orders were frequently not followed because of language problems. Many of the notionally Omani soldiers were recruited from the province of Dhofar, and looked down upon by other Arabs.

The Army was still unable to deal with Talib's stronghold. The few paths up the Jebel Akhdar were far too narrow to deploy attacking battalions or even companies. One attempt was made against the southern face of the Jebel, using four infantry companies (including two companies from the Trucial Oman Scouts, from what would later become the United Arab Emirates. The attackers withdrew hastily after concluding they were vulnerable to being ambushed and cut off. In another attempt, infantry launched a feint and then withdrew while Avro Shackleton bombers of the RAF bombarded the supposedly massed defenders. They inflicted no casualties.

For two years, rebel infiltrators continually mined the roads around the Jebel, and ambushed SAF and British detachments and oil company vehicles. The SAF were spread in small detachments in the towns and villages at the foot of the Jebel, and thus vulnerable and on the defensive. Their arms (mainly British weapons of World War II vintage) were less effective than the up-to-date equipment used by Talib's fighters. An SAF artillery unit with two 5.5-inch medium guns harassed the settlements on the plateau on top of the Jebel Akhdar, to little effect.

It was estimated by some British officers that a full-scale attack by a British brigade would be required to recapture the jebel. Smiley and others felt that a smaller operation by Special Forces with air support would suffice. Eventually in 1959, two squadrons from the British Special Air Service were deployed, under Anthony Deane-Drummond. After making feint operations against outlying positions on the north side of the Jebel, they scaled the southern face of the Jebel at night, taking the rebels by surprise. Supplies were parachuted to them once they reached the plateau; this may have misled some of the rebels into thinking that this was an assault by paratroops. There was little further fighting. Talib and his fighters either melted back into the local population or fled to Saudi Arabia.

==== Later operations in Oman ====
Some insurgents continued to cross into Oman from Saudi Arabia or via the UAE, and laid landmines which continued to cause casualties to SAF units and civilian vehicles. The SAF lacked the numbers to prevent this infiltration. A paramilitary force, the Oman Gendarmerie was formed in 1960 to assist the SAF in this task, and also to take over normal policing duties. The landmine campaign eventually dwindled away.

The only apparent threat to Oman at this point appeared to be a shadowy Marxist group who attempted to assassinate the Sultan's Interior Minister, and may also have planted bombs on civil aircraft, including a Vickers Viscount of United Arab Airlines which broke up in mid-air 27.5 kilometres (17.1 mi) north of Elba on 29 September 1960, killing all 23 people on board.

=== Dhofar campaign ===
In 1964, a rebellion began in the southern province of Dhofar, again supported by Saudi Arabia. The initial aims of the rebellion were greater autonomy for the region, and an improvement in its living standards.

The Sultan's forces in Dhofar consisted only of an irregular Dhofar Force, recruited from local "jibali" tribes. Only in 1965 were two battalions of the SAF sent to the province. Most units of the Omani Army at this time were understrength, and badly equipped and trained. The air force consisted of a few piston-engined transport and ground-attack aircraft. The navy possessed a single dhow.

The Dhofar Force was disbanded in 1966, after some of its members tried to assassinate the Sultan. The Desert Regiment was raised to replace it. The Southern Regiment was also formed and all Baluchi soldiers from Pakistan were eventually concentrated in the two battalions of this regiment, although the change took several years to implement fully.

The rebellion continued at a low level until 1967. In that year, the establishment of the People's Democratic Republic of Yemen (PDRY) adjacent to Dhofar, gave the rebels access to sources of arms, supplies and recruits, and also radicalised the rebel movement. As the PFLOAG (Popular Front for the Liberation of the Occupied Arabian Gulf), this sought the overthrow of the Sultanate and other pro-Western regimes in the Persian Gulf.

By 1969, the Adoo, as the PFLOAG rebels were known, had overrun much of Dhofar, and there were attacks on SAF positions elsewhere in Oman. It was clear to the Sultan's British backers and advisors that the situation was critical. Said bin Taimur's rule had been reactionary and despotic. Almost all progress since the Middle Ages had been outlawed in Oman. In 1970, the Sultan was overthrown in a palace coup, which was planned and supported by the British. His son, Qaboos bin Said, replaced him.

==== Reform and modernisation ====
Qaboos had attended Sandhurst and served as an officer in the British Army with the 1st Bn the Cameronians (Scottish Rifles). His outlook was far wider and more liberal than his father's. He immediately instituted major social and military reforms throughout the country. As part of a "hearts and minds" campaign to win over the population of Dhofar, an amnesty was declared for surrendered rebels. Former rebels formed Firqat irregular units, trained and assisted by teams from the Special Air Service. The Firqats eventually numbered 1800, and deprived the rebels of local support in their home areas.

Meanwhile, the regular units of the Army were expanded and re-equipped. More Omanis were recruited and Baluchis were concentrated in separated units. Large numbers of officers and NCO instructors seconded from the British Army and Royal Marines were attached to units. (There were also several British and Commonwealth mercenaries). Two new infantry units were raised in 1971: the Frontier Force (a Baluchi unit) in Dhofar, and the Jebel Regiment in the interior of Oman.

The various supporting arms, which had previously existed as ad hoc units and detachments were also formally established. The new corps were the Artillery Regiment, Signal Regiment, Armoured Car Squadron, Engineering Unit, Garrison Detachment and the Training Regiment. The Oman Gendarmerie was also strengthened and modernised.

The Air Force acquired BAC Strikemaster and Hawker Hunter attack aircraft, Shorts Skyvan and Caribou transport aircraft, and UH-1 Iroquois helicopters, flown by seconded RAF or contract (i.e. mercenary) pilots. Two Pilatus Porter air ambulances used extensively during the Dhofar conflict were retained in the Air Force until the late 1970s.

==== Later operations in Dhofar ====
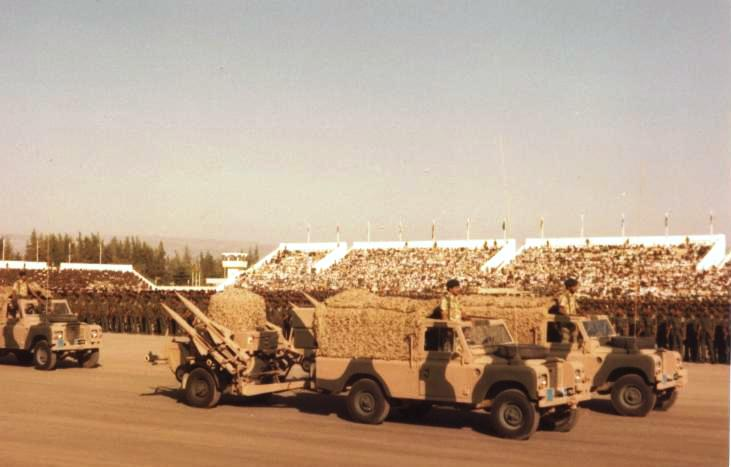
Anti-aircraft missiles of the Oman Artillery (Land Rovers towing Rapier missile wheeled launchers)

The army established lines of defensive posts to block rebel movements and supply trains, assisted by troops supplied by the Shah of Iran. The process took time, but by 1972 the rebels were being starved of support. To retrieve the situation, they launched a major attack on the coastal town of Mirbat, but were defeated by Firqats, Gendarmerie and SAS detachments, with air support.

In 1973, an SAF offensive intended to capture the main rebel supply base at Shershitti Caves was defeated, although an exposed position at Sarfait near the border with the PDRY was captured. This position, codenamed Simba, was held for two years. Meanwhile, the Adoo were slowly driven to the edge of their former territory. Another offensive in 1975 finally isolated the rebels from the PDRY. The rebellion was declared to be over in 1976.

At the end of this period, the Army numbered 13,000. It was organised into a Southern Brigade (under Brigadier John Akehurst, responsible for operations in Dhofar), and a Northern Brigade which garrisoned the rest of the country. The Army's Commander-in-Chief during most of the Dhofar rebellion was Major General Timothy Creasey, who was replaced near the end of the conflict by Major General Ken Perkins.

=== Gulf Wars ===
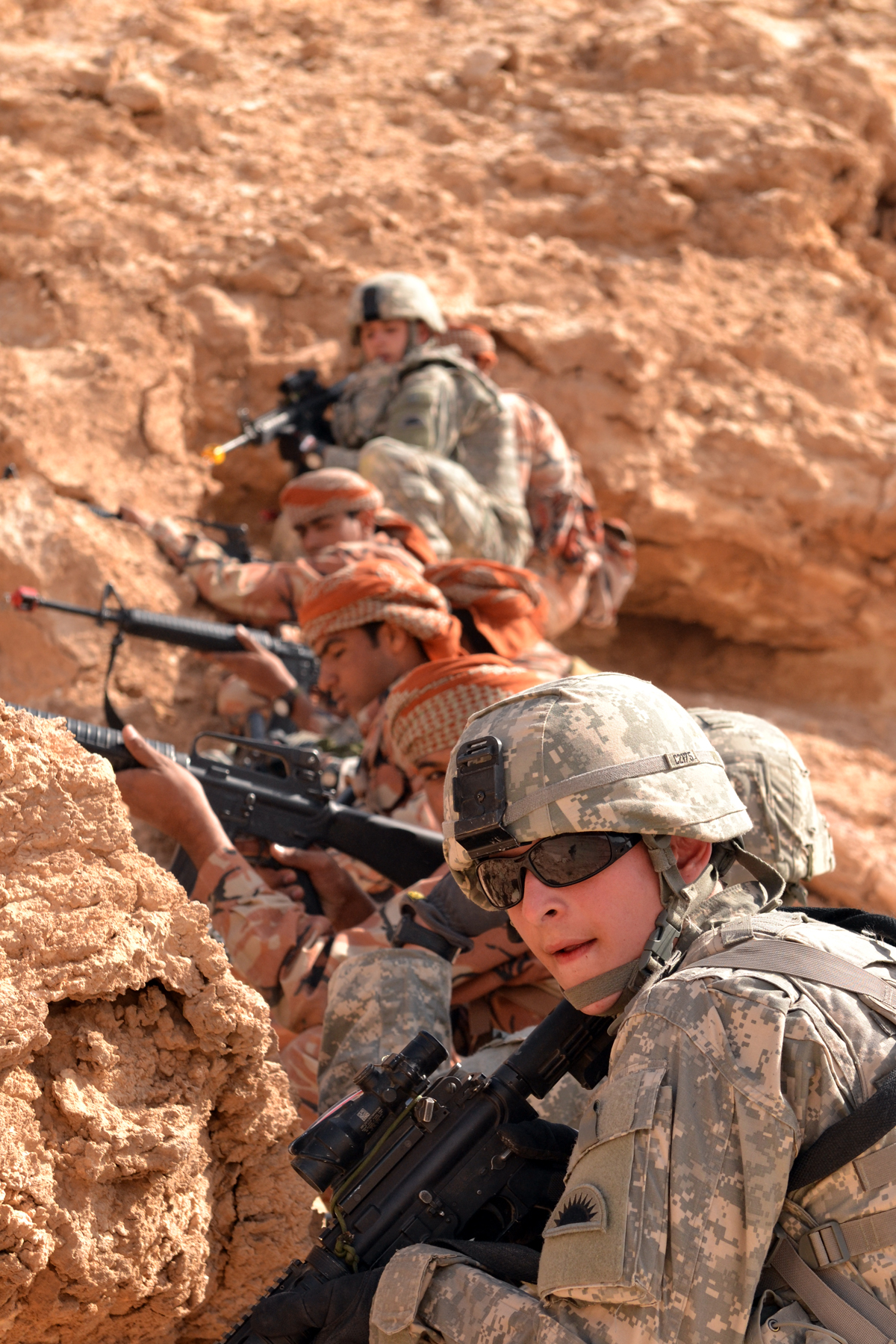
American Oregon National Guard training in Oman alongside the Omani Army

In the years following the end of the Dhofar rebellion, the SAF continued to expand and modernise. Links with Britain remained close and all three UK armed services have provided advisers on Loan Service to the SAF and this arrangement remains in place; although numbers have steadily reduced as 'Omanisation' progressed. One facility enjoyed by Britain was the use of the airbase on Masirah Island off the southern coast, as a staging post. The United States was granted the same facilities, which was to become important as tension increased in the Persian Gulf. In the mid-1980s the Sultan of Oman's Air Force (SOAF) operated Hawker Hunter F6, SEPECAT Jaguar and C-130 Hercules aircraft from an in-country air base at Thumrait.

In 1987 there was a border conflict with the PDRY which saw the whole of the SAF mobilised. Sorties into Oman by Toyota pickup trucks armed with Dushka 12.5mm heavy machine guns killed several lightly armed Omani troops. The PDRY sent a Motorised Infantry force to reinforce the border but this was destroyed by SOAF Jaguars. Peace talks quickly followed.

As part of the Gulf Cooperation Council (GCC), Oman assigned an infantry battalion to the force known as Peninsula Shield during the Iran–Iraq War.

In 1990, the Iraqi Army unexpectedly invaded Kuwait, also a member of the GCC. A large international coalition formed, first to discourage further Iraqi aggression. The aims of the coalition changed to the restoration of Kuwaiti sovereignty, as more forces were deployed to Saudi Arabia. Oman's role in First Gulf War was mainly as a base area and staging post for the large United States Air Force and British Royal Air Force contingents deployed to the Persian Gulf. Some transport aircraft and tanker aircraft flew out of Masirah, but the Sultan of Oman's Air Force did not directly participate in attacks on Iraq.

An Omani battalion served in Saudi Arabia, as part of the GCC contribution to the ground war to liberate Kuwait. It formed part of the Saudi Arabian-led Task Force Omar along with the Saudi 10th Mechanised Brigade. It advanced into Kuwait on the second day of the ground offensive and had no casualties.

In 2001, Oman hosted a large contingent of the British Army, which held Exercise Saif Sareea II (in which 12500 members of the SAF also participated). The stated aims of the exercise were to practise rapid deployment and test equipment in severe conditions.

== Present day ==
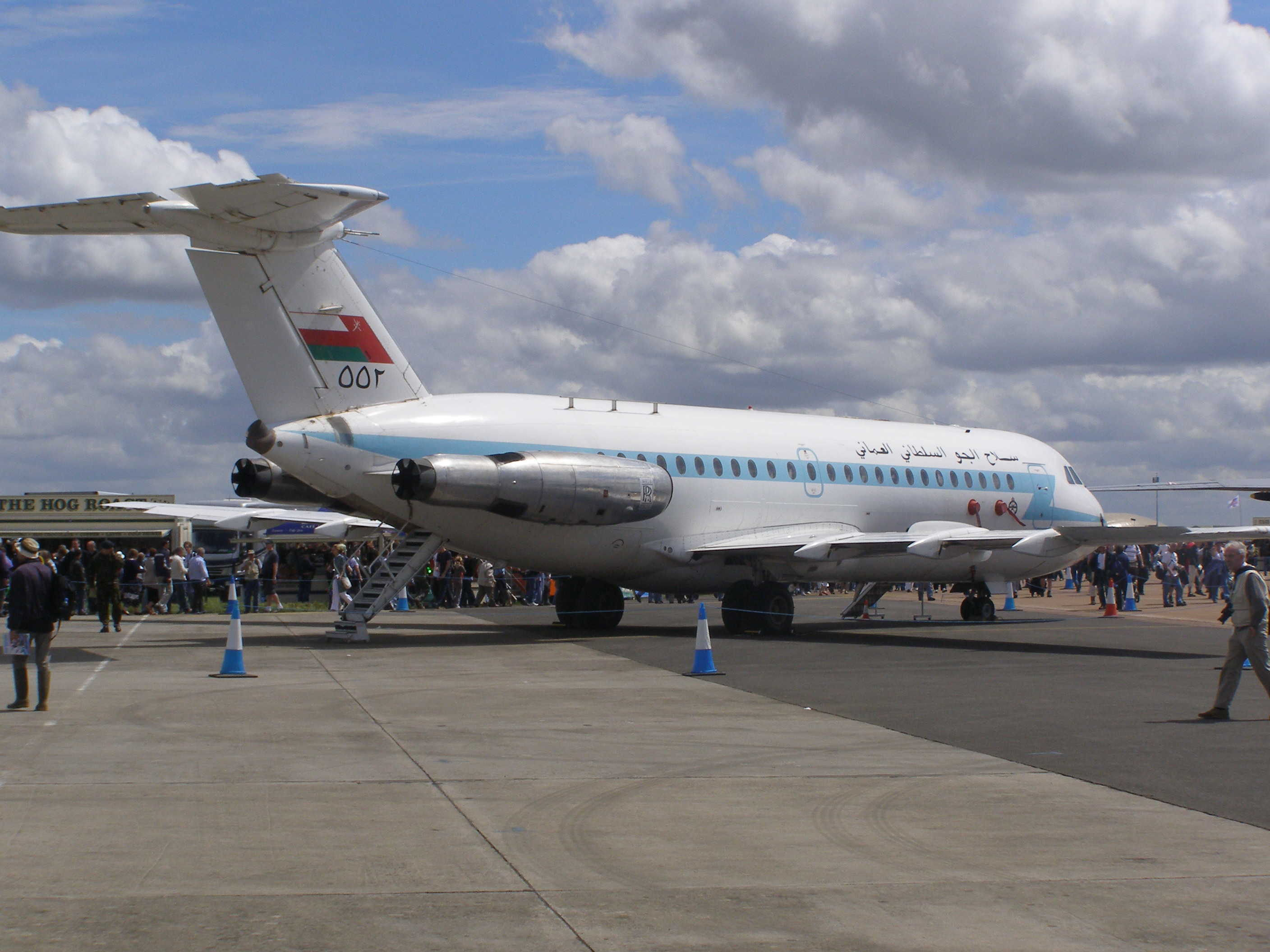
Royal Air Force of Oman BAC One-Eleven on display at RAF Fairford, England

Since the defeat of the Dhofar insurgents, the likelihood of internal strife caused by poverty or tribal dissension has steadily decreased as a result of the increasing standards of living, and the provision of public health and education.

Tension on Oman's western border has lessened since the Yemeni unification in 1990. Oman includes the tip of the Musandam Peninsula in the Persian Gulf, which may be significant in future conflicts in the region.

The army has steadily decreased its dependence on British and other foreign assistance, and increased its degree of mechanisation, although emphasis on light infantry operations remains; as part of their training, soldiers repeat the SAS ascent of the Jebel Akhdar in 1959. The Navy is one of the most modern in the region, and the Air Force is respected.

In any future major regional conflict, Oman may be able to rely on support and aid from Britain and the United States.

== Equipment ==
The army is qualitatively superior to that of many neighbouring countries except Saudi Arabia and Iran, with one regiment of British-built Challenger 2 main battle tanks and the other slightly larger regiment of M60 (predominantly M60A3s) MBTs rounding out Oman's sole armoured brigade. Oman recently received 174 Piranha light armoured vehicles and over 80 VBL scout cars from France to further strengthen military capabilities. In terms of artillery, in the 1990s, Oman received G6 155 mm howitzers from South Africa, and Oman's anti-tank capabilities are to be greatly strengthened by the soon-to-be-delivered 100 Javelin missiles from the United States. On a troop level, Oman's armed forces are frequently trained and briefed by the regular British Army, including the elite Special Air Service (SAS).

The primary assault rifle of the army is the Austrian Steyr AUG rifle, with some special task units using M-16 and M-4 variants, plus many other small arms varieties.

== Sources ==
- Warlords of Oman, by Philip Allfree, 1967, Barnes
- Desert Warrior, by HRH Khaled bin Sultan, 1995, Harper Collins, ISBN 0-00-255612-X
