= Sultan's Special Force =

Omani counter-terrorism and counter-insurgency force

- قوات السلطان الخاصة
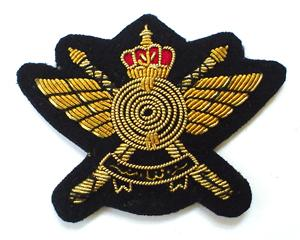
- The crest of the Sultan's Special Force (officer's beret badge)
- Country: Oman
- Allegiance: Sultan of Oman
- Type: Special forces
- Size: 2000
- Part of: Sultan's Armed Forces
- HQ SSF: Al Azaiba, Muscat, Oman
- Motto: !من يتجرأ ينتصر (Who Dares Wins)
- Colors: Lilac
- Anniversaries: 15 March

Commanders
- Commander SSF: Major General Muslim bin Mohammed bin Taman Jaaboub
- Supreme Commander: HM Sultan Haitham bin Tariq Al Said
- Notable commanders: Brigadier Tony Hunter-Choat OBE; Major General Amir bin Salim al Amri

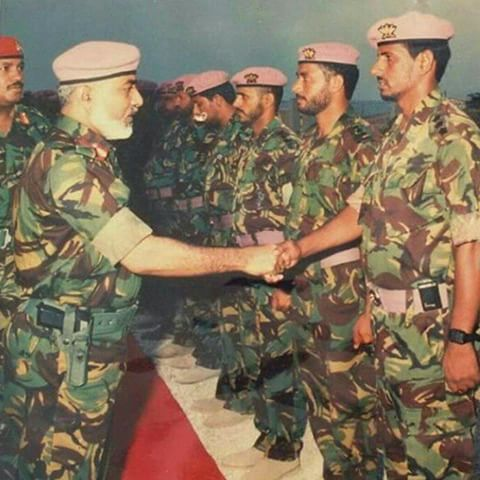
HM the Sultan of Oman congratulating SSF personnel

The Sultan's Special Force (SSF; Arabic: قوات السلطان الخاصة, romanized: Qawat al-Sultaniya al-Khasah) is a special operations force within the Sultan's Armed Forces (SAF).

The SSF was created based on the lessons learned in a successful (if not lengthy) prosecution of a counter insurgency campaign in the Dhofar. However, it was the time, effort and special tactics needed to achieve the victory that convinced the Sultan that he needed his own domestic special purpose force. There has been and remains a clear and constant relationship between the SSF and the Palace Office, a government ministry which oversees all aspects of the Sultanate's security .

== History of the force ==
During the Dhofar Insurgency of the 1960s and 1970s Sutan Qaboos bin Said became very reliant on the British Armed Forces to improve the expertise of his fledgling armed forces battling to defeat Communist insurgents in the south of the country. He became particularly reliant on members of the Special Air Service (SAS) who formed training teams. After the successful conclusion of the Dhofar War Sultan Qaboos decided to develop his own Omani SF capability. He did so relying heavily on retired British personnel (many from the SAS) and during the latter part of the 20th Century the SSF developed.

The SSF was developed from the most able of the Dhofari Firqat forces that were trained by the SAS. The SSF's badge includes a representation of the compact Dhofari leather shield (also used on the SAF's Firqat Forces badge) and wings similar to the SAS parachute qualification badge.

In 1985 the Sultan authorized a medal to recognise the service of SSF personnel; known as the Special Service Medal of the Sultan's Special Force (Midal al-Khidmat al-Khasat Qawat al-Sultaniya al-Khasat).

Brigadier Tony Hunter-Choat OBE (formerly UK SAS) was the last British commander of the SSF (retiring in 1997) the post then filled by an Omani officer.

== Organisation ==
The SSF is split geographically into two units with operational elements based in the Muscat capital area and in Dhofar Mountains to the north of Salalah.

The SSF is trained, equipped and exercised in Counter-terrorism (CT) skills; and one of the SSF's elite CT units is called Cobra based in the north and south of the country, and one Cobra team works closely with the Royal Oman Police.

In the late 1990s the SSF were also involved in patrolling and observation duties in the Sultanate's Oryx Sanctuary, that was at the time suffering from a great deal of poaching. The SSF has limited responsibilities in counter smuggling and border patrolling.

== Base locations ==
- Headquarters SSF at Al Azaiba; the main HQ building is at Latitude/Longitude 23.588366N, 58.344137E the (SSF clinic is marked on mapping) There are staff married quarters and villas at the SSF complex at Al Azaiba
- The main base for the SSF's northern units is a substantial modern barracks associated with Muaskar Al Samoud, with an extensive training facility and ranges next to the village of Halban near Seeb; the HQ building is at Latitude/Longitude 23.619486N, 58.037970E
- The main base for the SSF's southern units was developed on a former SAS-Firqat training base near Zeek in the Dhofar Jebel, at Sharbithat this extensive base is at Latitude/Longitude 17.275175N, 54.126446E
- An operational base exists at Haima in the Al Wusta region with a focus on the Sultanate's Western border with Saudi Arabia.

== Equipment ==
The SSF is equipped with a range of light infantry and assault weapons, equipment and vehicles, including:

- A range of modern conventional and suppressed assault small arms
- Advanced and compact night vision aids
- Various grenades
- Sniper weapons and special camouflage uniforms
- Body armor and special protective clothing
- Modified Toyota Land Cruiser patrol and assault vehicles
- Humvee desert patrol vehicles equipped with a range of support weapons (e.g. heavy machine guns and missiles)
- Mercedes G300 cdi 6x6 (high mobility troop and load carrying vehicles)
- Inshore fast assault boats
- Stealth assault swimmer diving equipment
- Fighting in built up area, breaching aids
- EMPL heavy recovery vehicles.

The Force has adopted modern military combat survival methods, as illustrated by the SSF's ration packs.

== See also ==
- Sultan of Oman's Armed Forces
- Omani Civil War (1963-76)
