= Firqa (military) =

Omani regional militia force

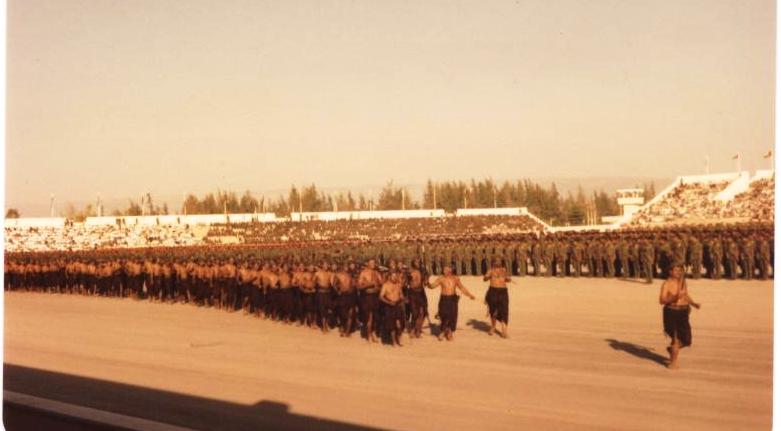
Firqa irregulars on parade with regular SAF units in 1981

A Firqa (Arabic: فِرْقَة, lit. 'band'; called Firqat in plural), is a local militia unit loyal to the Sultan of Oman raised in the Dhofar region of Oman during the Dhofar War. The British were known for utilising Firqa during their counter insurgency operations in support of the Sultan's operations in the region, converting former enemies into pro-government militia to aid in counter-insurgency; this was a tactic the British had successfully employed in Malaya. Forming local Firqa was therefore great way to employ surrendered enemy personnel (SEPs) and thus pacify areas of the Dhofari Jebel and set the conditions for infrastructure development.

During the insurgency in Dhofar, Firqa forces proved invaluable as both a tactical and psychological weapon; although their use beyond Jebali tribal areas was problematic.

Firqa continued at least until recent times; as recently as 1990 the Omani government was issuing payments of 120-140 rials per month. This payment was both to maintain a pro-government paramilitary force, as well as to enable nomadic Omanis to continue living in their traditional areas.

== See also ==
- Sultan's Special Force
