= Royal Air Force of Oman =

Air warfare branch of Oman's military

- سلاح الجو السلطاني عمان; Silāḥ al-Jaww as-Sulṭāniy ‘Umān
- Badge of the Royal Air Force of Oman
- Founded: 1959; 67 years ago
- Country: Oman
- Type: Air force
- Size: 5,000 personnel (2024)
- Part of: Sultan's Armed Forces
- Equipment: 127 aircraft (2025)
- Engagements: Dhofar Rebellion

Commanders
- Supreme Commander: Sultan Haitham bin Tariq
- Minister of Defense: Shihab bin Tariq Al Said
- Armed Forces Chief of Staff: Vice Adm. Abdullah bin Khamis bin Abdullah Al Raisi
- Commander of the RAFO: Air Vice-Marshal Khamis bin Hammad Al-Ghafri

Insignia
- Fin flash

- Flag

Aircraft flown
- Fighter: F-16 Fighting Falcon, Eurofighter Typhoon
- Helicopter: Super Lynx, NH90, Bell 429, Bell 206
- Trainer: BAe Hawk 166, Pilatus PC-9, PAC Super MFI-17 Mushshak
- Transport: C-130 Hercules, Airbus A320, Dornier 228

The Royal Air Force of Oman (Arabic: سلاح الجو السلطاني عمان, romanized: Silāḥ al-Jaww as-Sulṭāniy ‘Umān or RAFO) is the air arm of the Sultan's Armed Forces.

== History ==
=== Sultan of Oman's Air Force era ===
The Sultan of Oman's Air Force (SOAF) was formed with British personnel and aircraft in March 1959. The first seven pilots under Squadron Leader Barry Atkinson gathered at RAF Manby in Lincolnshire that month. They were initially allocated a total of five aircraft. The first aircraft were two Scottish Aviation Pioneers transferred from the Royal Air Force. The first armed aircraft was the Percival Provost T52.

In 1968 the SOAF received the first of 24 BAC Strikemaster jet trainer and light strike aircraft for operation against insurgents in the Dhofar region. In 1974 the SOAF was expanded with orders for the Britten Norman Defender, BAC One-Eleven, Vickers VC10 and 32 Hawker Hunter ground attack aircraft. In 1977 SEPECAT Jaguars joined the SOAF, followed in the 1980s by the BAE Hawk.

=== Royal Air Force of Oman era ===
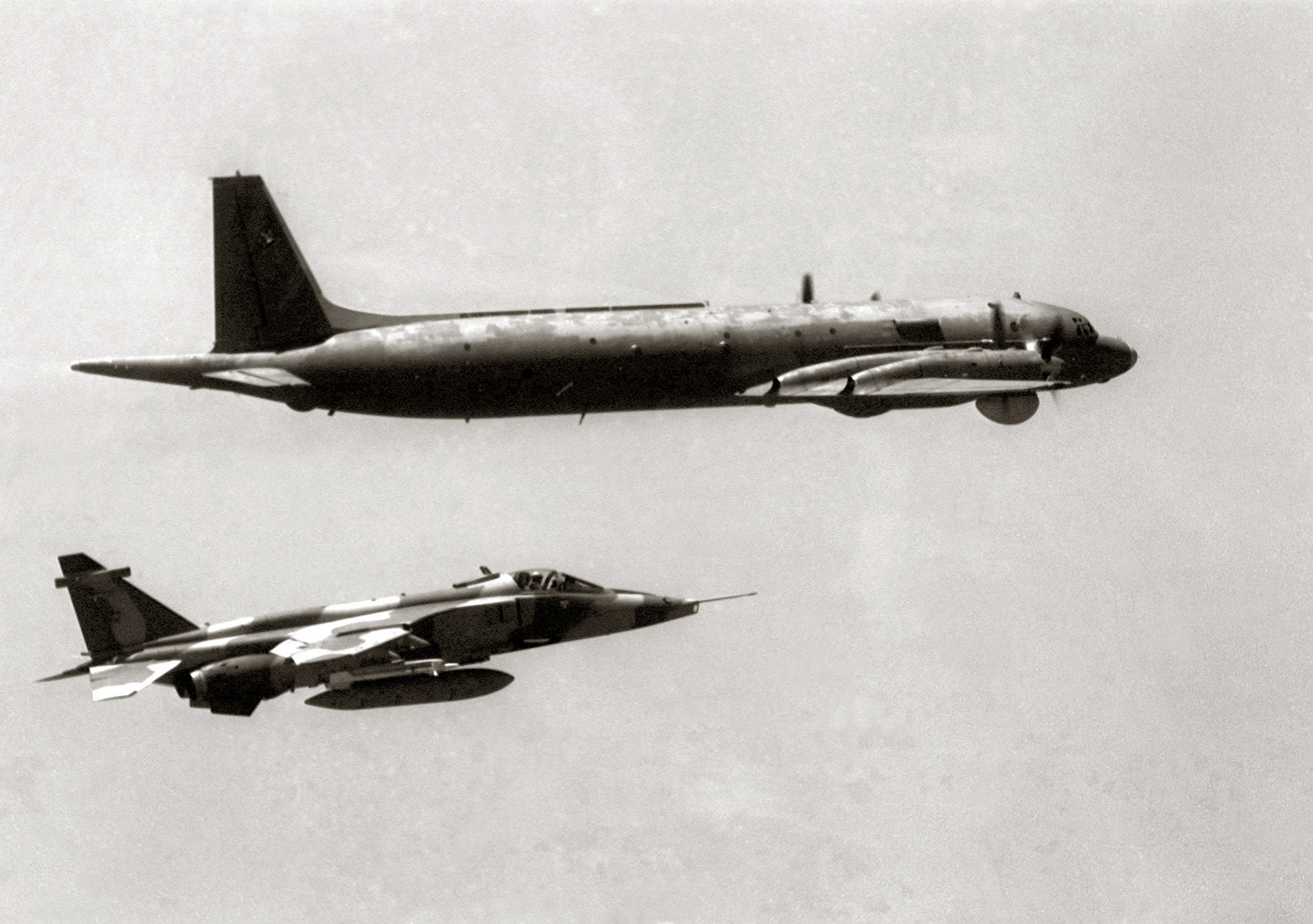
A Royal Air Force of Oman Jaguar intercepting an Il-38 in 1987

In 1990 the SOAF was renamed the Royal Air Force of Oman (RAFO). In 1993 and 1994 the RAFO replaced its Hawker Hunters with four BAE Hawk Mk 103 fighter-trainers and 12 single-seat Hawk Mk 203s, equipped with Westinghouse APG-66H radar, as light ground attack aircraft/interceptors. In September 1997, after the evaluation of new combat aircraft, the RAFO decided to upgrade and extend the service lives of its remaining 17 SEPECAT Jaguar ground attack aircraft until the second decade of the 21st century. A contract was placed with the United Kingdom Ministry of Defence to upgrade the avionics of the Jaguar aircraft for $40 million. In 2005, deliveries of Lockheed Martin F-16 Fighting Falcon Block 50 aircraft began, equipped with improved GPS/INS. The aircraft can carry a further batch of advanced missiles; the AGM-88 HARM missile, JDAM, JSOW and WCMD.

On 3 August 2010, the US Defense Security Cooperation Agency notified Congress of a possible sale of 18 F-16 Block 50/52 to Oman in a contract worth US$3.5 Billion. In addition to the new fighters, the contract included upgrading the existing 12 F-16C/D in the RAFO inventory. On 14 December 2011, it was announced that Oman had agreed to buy an additional 12 F-16C/D Block 50s to join the 12 F-16C/Ds already in service.

Oman was considering the purchase of either the Eurofighter Typhoon or the JAS 39 Gripen, but on 21 December 2012 a £2.5 billion deal was signed in Muscat to supply RAFO with 12 Eurofighter Typhoon fighter jets and eight BAE Hawk Advanced Jet Trainer aircraft. The deliveries were completed in 2018.

=== Accidents and incidents ===
On May 19, 1971, a De Havilland Canada DHC-4 Caribou crashed on takeoff in Janook Airstrip in Dhofar, killing all 3 crew members, the cause was determined a engine failure, causing an explosion.

On September 30, 1976, Hawker Hunter was taxiing at RAFO Thumrait, until the pilot smell smoke coming from the cockpit, the fire came to the aircraft, both crew are unable to ejected and both were killed by Asphyxiation.

== Bases ==
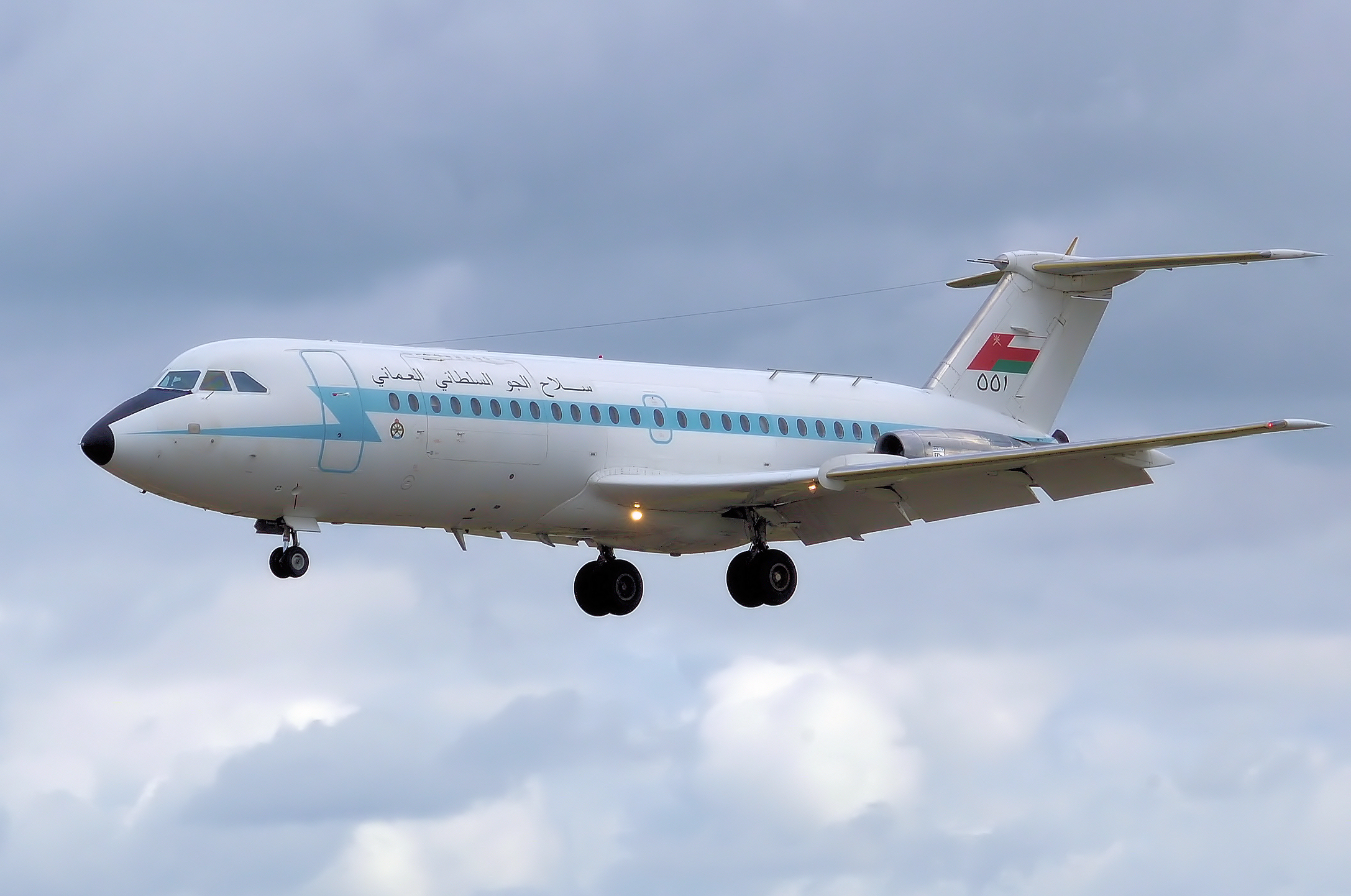
Royal Air Force of Oman BAC 1-11 Model 485GD at RIAT 2008, UK

Installation	Unit with aircraft type	Notes
RAFO Adam	No. 8 Squadron with Eurofighter Typhoon	
RAFO Khasab	No. 14 Squadron (det) with NH90-TTH	
RAFO Musannah	No. 14 Squadron (det) with NH90-TTH	
	No. 15 Squadron with Super Lynx Mk.120	
	No. 16 Squadron with C-130H & C-130J	
	No. 5 Squadron with C295M	
RAFO Masirah	No. 1 Squadron with Super Mushshak & PC-9(M)	
	No. 6 Squadron with Hawk 166	
	No. 15 Squadron (det) with Super Lynx Mk.120	
RAFO Seeb	Air base co-located within Muscat International Airport.	
	No. 4 Squadron with A320-214CJ	
RAFO Salalah	No. 3 Squadron with NH90-TTH, Bell 429	
	No. 5 Squadron with C295M	
RAFO Thumrait	No. 18 Squadron with F-16C-50-CF & F-16D-50-CF	
	No. 20 Squadron with F-16C-50-CF & F-16D-50-CF	

== Aircraft ==
=== Current inventory ===
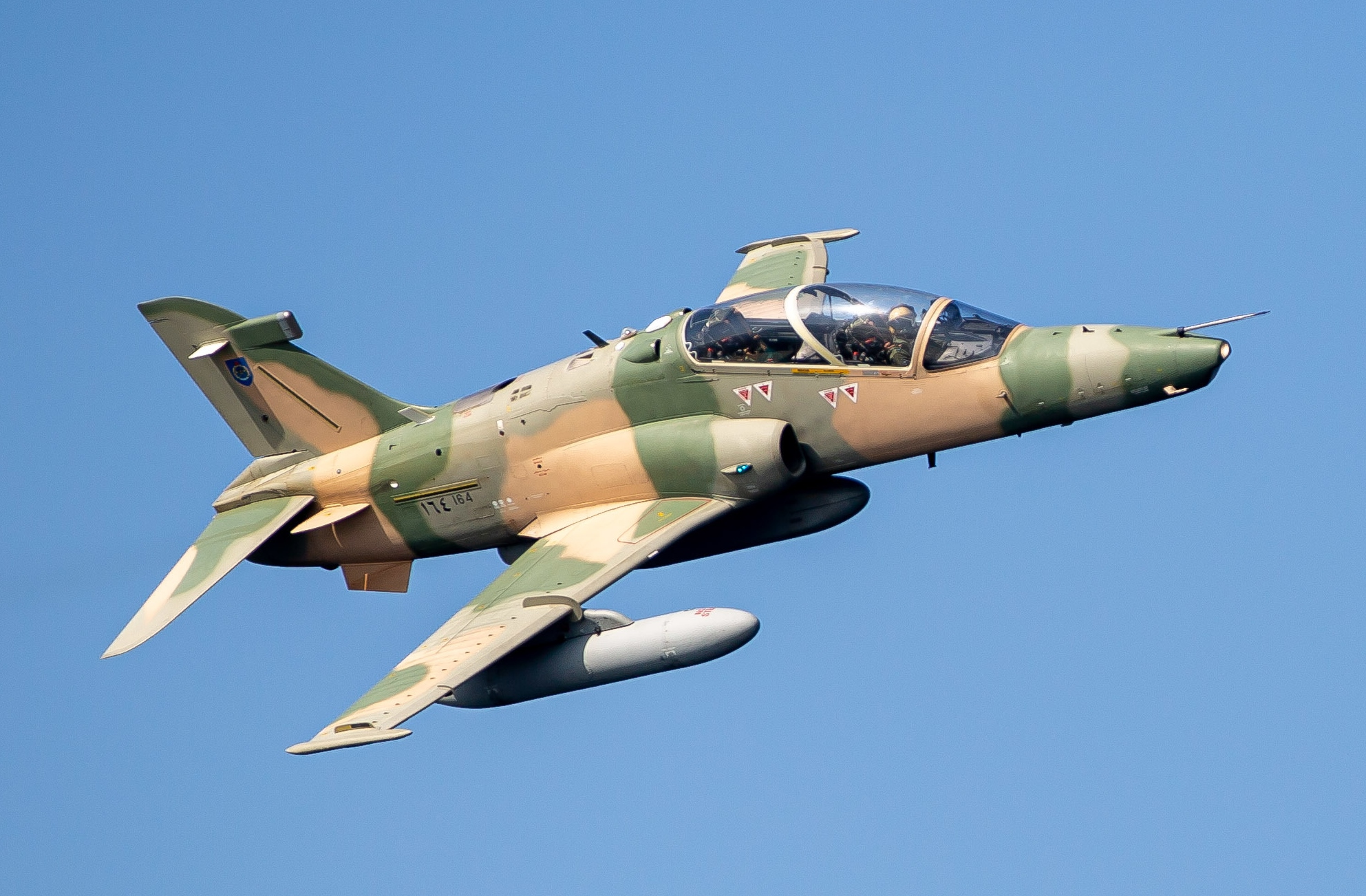
Hawk Mk 103 advanced trainer

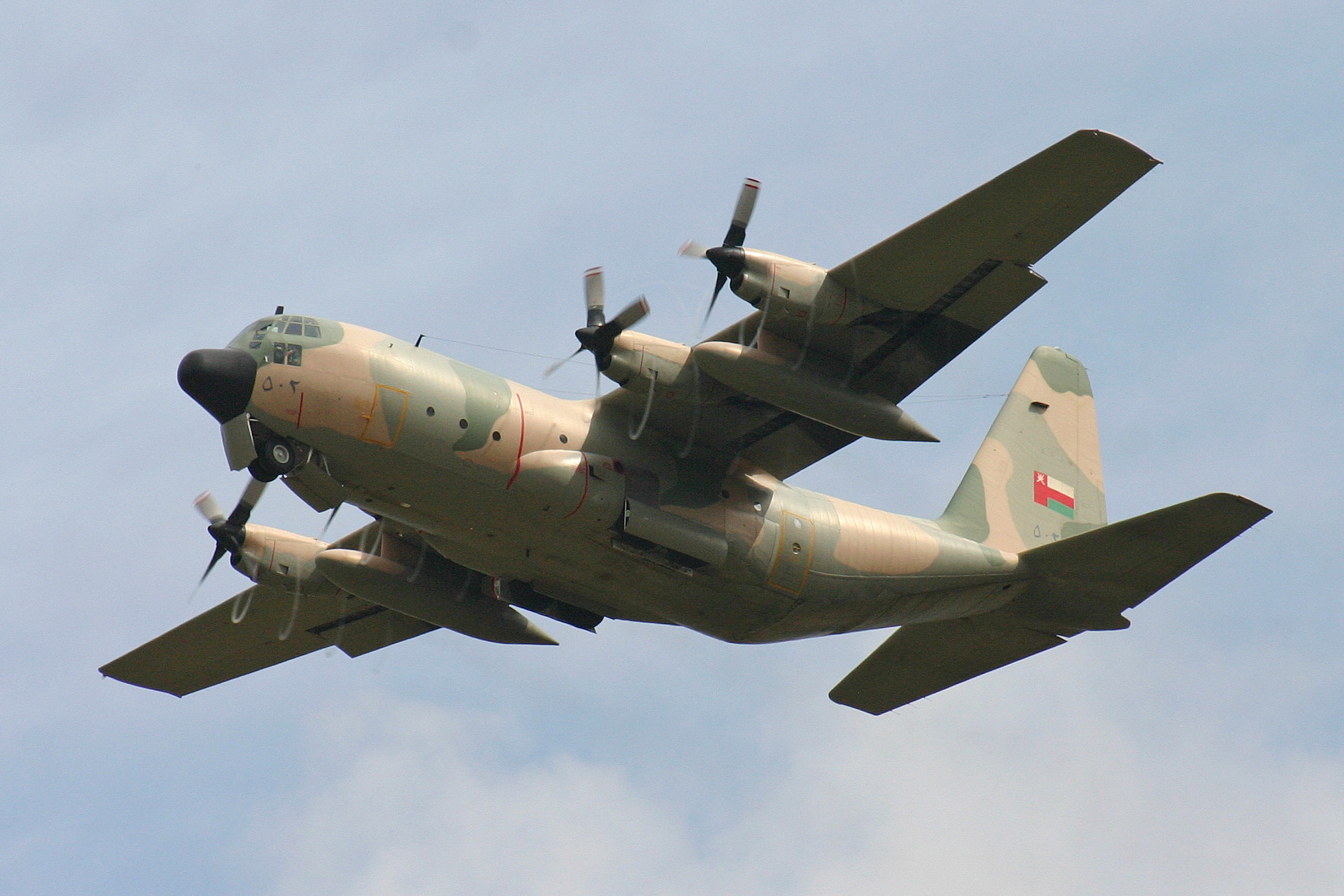
C-130H Hercules on take off

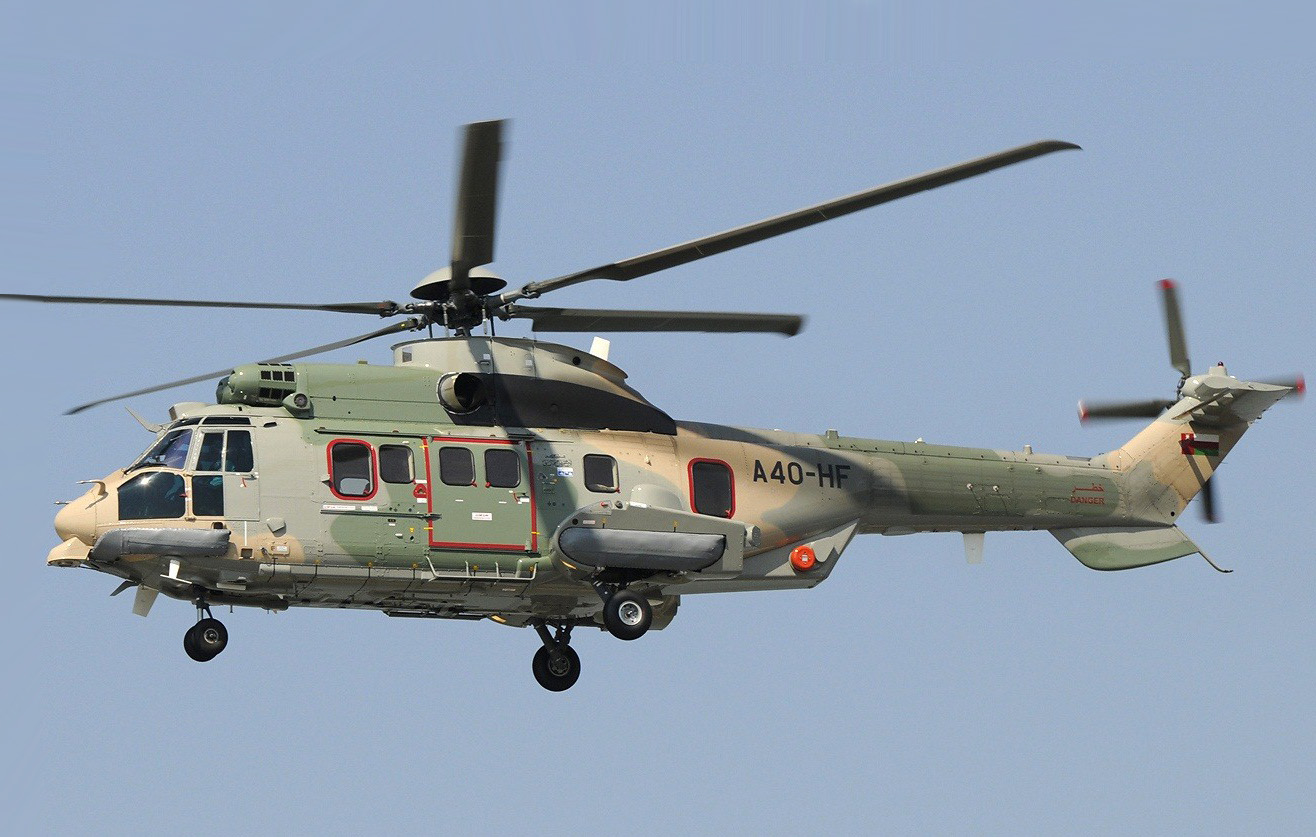
Super Puma

Aircraft	Origin	Type	Variant	In service	Notes
Combat aircraft
Eurofighter Typhoon	United Kingdom / Germany / Italy / Spain	Swingrole fighter	Tranche 3A	12	
F-16	United States	Multirole fighter	F-16C; Block 50	17	
BAE Hawk	United Kingdom	Light multirole fighter	Hawk 203	10	
Special mission aircraft
Airbus C295	Spain	Maritime patrol	C295 MPA	4	
Transport
Airbus C295	Spain	Tactical airlifter	C295M	4	
C-130 Hercules	United States	Tactical airlifter	C-130H	3	
C-130 Super Hercules	United States	Tactical airlifter	C-130J-30	2	
Helicopters
NHIndustries NH90	France / Germany / Italy / Netherlands	Medium utility military helicopter	NH90 TTH	18	Assembled on the French assembly line.
Westland Lynx	United Kingdom	ASuW / SAR	Super Lynx Mk.120	13	
Trainer aircraft
F-16	United States	Conversion trainer	F-16D; Block 50	6	
BAE Hawk	United Kingdom	Advanced trainer	Hawk AJT - 166 (advanced jet trainer)	8	
BAE Hawk	United Kingdom	Advanced trainer	Hawk 103	3	
Pilatus PC-9	Switzerland	Basic trainer	PC-9M	12	
PAC Mushshak	Pakistan	Ab initio trainer	MFI-395 Super Mushshak	7	
Bell 429	USA/Canada/South Korea	Helicopter	Bell 429	5	
Bell 206	USA	Helicopter	Bell 206	4	
Bell 429	Canada / United States / South Korea	Surveillance helicopter / CSAR	–	5	Made in Canada
Agusta-Bell 206	Italy / United States	Rotorcraft training / liaison aircraft	AB206A	4	

=== Retired ===
Previous aircraft flown by the Air Force included the SEPECAT Jaguar S/B, Hawker Hunter, BAC Strikemaster, Douglas DC-8, Britten-Norman BN-2 Islander, Skyvan 3M, BAe BAC-1-11, Scheibe Super-Falke, and the Bell 214B helicopter

== Commanders ==
Squadron Leader Barry Atkinson supervised the first group of pilots allocated for the SOAF from the time they gathered at an RAF station in northern England in early 1959.

Air Vice-Marshal Erik Bennett of the Royal Air Force commanded the Sultan of Oman's Air Force from 1974 to 1990. In June 1990, Air Vice-Marshal Talib bin Meran bin Zaman Al-Raeesi became the first Omani national to command the air force. He was succeeded by Air Vice-Marshal Mohammed bin Mahfoodh bin Saad Al-Ardhi, who was appointed Commander of the Royal Air Force of Oman on 23 November 1992 and served through the 1990s and into the 2000s. On 1 February 2003, Air Vice-Marshal Yahya bin Rashid Al-Juma was appointed Commander. Air Vice-Marshal Khamis bin Hammad Al-Ghafri assumed command on 18 January 2021.

== Ranks ==
=== Commissioned officer ranks ===
The rank insignia of commissioned officers.

Rank group	General / flag officers					Senior officers			Junior officers
Royal Air Force of Oman
Royal Air Force of Oman	مشیر; Mushir	فريق أول; Fariq 'awal	فريق; Fariq	لواء; Liwa	عميد; Amid	عقيد; Aqid	مقدم; Muqaddam	رائد; Ra'id	نقيب; Naqib	ملازم أول; Mulazim awwal	ملازم; Mulazim

=== Other ranks ===
The rank insignia of non-commissioned officers and enlisted personnel.

Rank group	Senior NCOs				Junior NCOs		Enlisted
Royal Air Force of Oman							No insignia
Royal Air Force of Oman	وکیل کتیبة; Wakil katiba	وکیل; Wakil	رقیب اول; Raqib 'awal	رقیب; Raqib	عریف; Earif	نائب عریف; Nayib earif	جندي; Jundiun
