= Thumrait =

Thumrait Thumrayt
- Wilayat
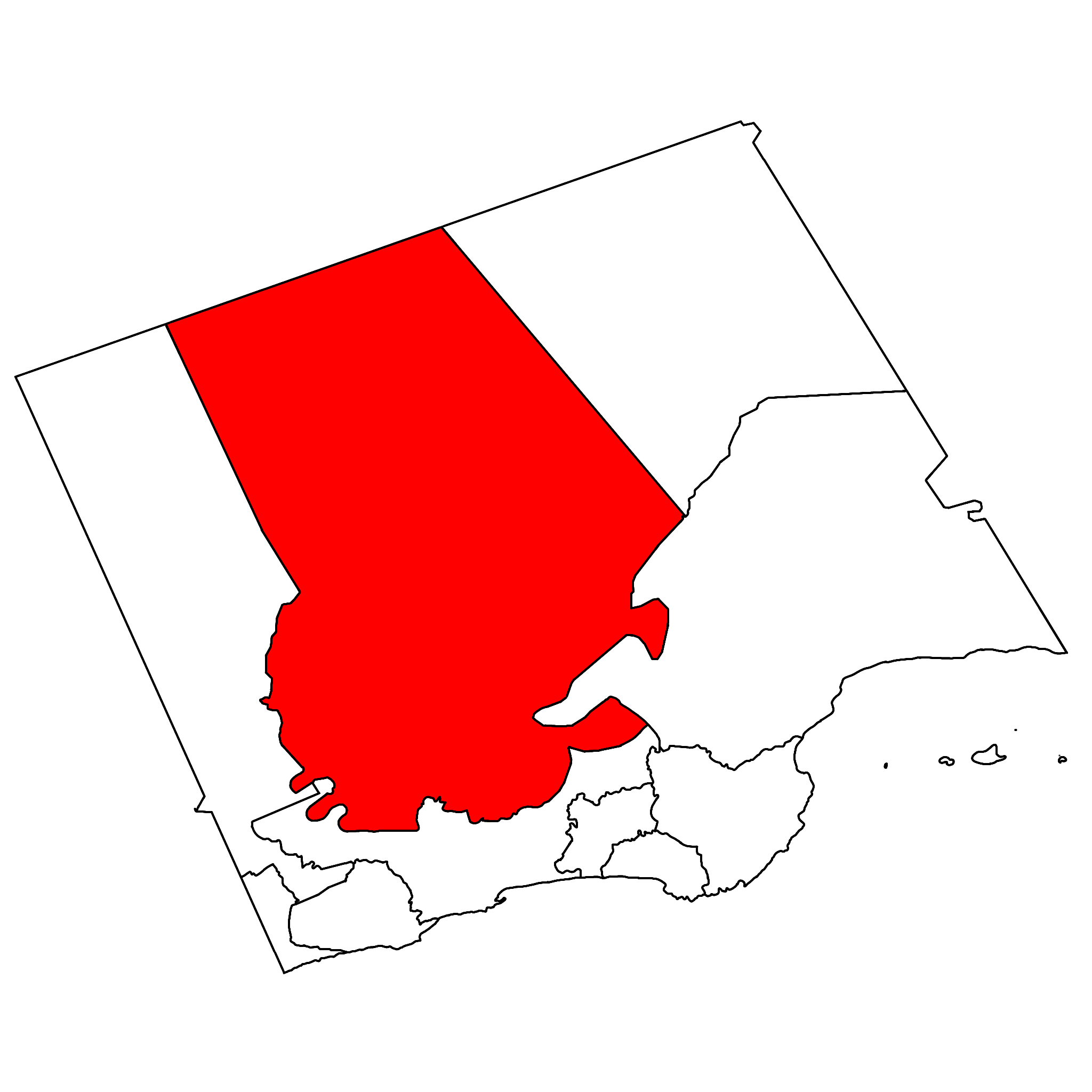
- The wilayat of Thumrait in the Dhofar Governorate

- Location in Oman
- Coordinates: 17°40′01″N 54°01′58″E
- Country: Oman
- Governorate: Dhofar
- Wilayat: Thumrait

Population (2020-12-12)
  - Total: 10,552
- (Only for the town of Thumrait, not the entire wilayat.)
- Time zone: UTC+4 (GST)

Thumrait (Arabic: ثمريت) is a small town and wilayat (province) of the Dhofar Governorate in southern Oman. As of the 2020 Omani census, Thumrait had a population of 10,552. In ancient times Thumrait was an important point on the Arabian peninsula's caravan routes. Frankincense trees, an important crop, used to grow in greater abundance in Thumrait than now. The main occupation of the people of Thumrait is the cultivation of fruit, vegetables and animal fodder.

== Military ==
Thumrait is notable for its Royal Air Force of Oman (RAFO) station. Originally an oil depot, RAFO Thumrait was created to establish air power in that region of Oman. The first Omani air unit based at Thumrait, equipped with Hawker Hunter FG.9 aircraft, was tasked with ground attack and intercept missions. 12 new SEPECAT Jaguar fighter-bombers were added to the base's complement to improve attack capabilities in 1977.

RAFO Thumrait has been used by US, UK and Allied air forces to support operations during Operations Desert Shield and Desert Storm around the time of the Gulf War, and later during the War in Afghanistan (2001-2021). Operations did shift though to Muscat International Airport, which was closer to Afghanistan.

Thumrait is also the home of the Western Frontier Regiment.

== Exercises held at Thumrait Air Base ==
In 2009, Indian Air Force pilots of ‘Flaming Arrows’ and ‘Cobras’, the two SEPECAT Jaguar Squadrons participated in joint exercises called ‘Eastern Bridge’ alongside the RAFO's force of SEPECAT Jaguars and General Dynamics F-16 Fighting Falcons at Thumrait Air Base. A subsequent Indo-Omani exercise, ‘Eastern Bridge-II,’ took place in 2011 at Indian Air Force Station Jamnagar (Gujarat).

== Climate ==
Thumrait has a hot desert climate (Köppen climate classification BWh) with very hot summers and warm winters. There is very little rainfall; some rain may occur from February to April, as well as June to August due to the monsoon.

Climate data for Thumrait (RAFO Thumrait), elevation 448 m (1,470 ft), (1991–2020 normals, extremes 1999–2022)
| Month | Jan | Feb | Mar | Apr | May | Jun | Jul | Aug | Sep | Oct | Nov | Dec | Year |
|---|---|---|---|---|---|---|---|---|---|---|---|---|---|
| Record high °C (°F) | 32.6 (90.7) | 35.0 (95.0) | 38.6 (101.5) | 41.0 (105.8) | 43.6 (110.5) | 45.4 (113.7) | 45.0 (113.0) | 46.0 (114.8) | 43.8 (110.8) | 40.0 (104.0) | 34.4 (93.9) | 32.0 (89.6) | 46.0 (114.8) |
| Mean daily maximum °C (°F) | 26.0 (78.8) | 28.9 (84.0) | 32.5 (90.5) | 36.4 (97.5) | 38.7 (101.7) | 40.3 (104.5) | 37.3 (99.1) | 37.1 (98.8) | 38.1 (100.6) | 35.0 (95.0) | 30.6 (87.1) | 26.9 (80.4) | 34.0 (93.2) |
| Daily mean °C (°F) | 19.2 (66.6) | 21.4 (70.5) | 24.9 (76.8) | 28.5 (83.3) | 31.0 (87.8) | 32.0 (89.6) | 29.9 (85.8) | 29.1 (84.4) | 29.5 (85.1) | 27.3 (81.1) | 23.8 (74.8) | 20.3 (68.5) | 26.4 (79.5) |
| Mean daily minimum °C (°F) | 12.5 (54.5) | 14.7 (58.5) | 18.3 (64.9) | 21.7 (71.1) | 24.5 (76.1) | 26.1 (79.0) | 25.0 (77.0) | 24.2 (75.6) | 23.3 (73.9) | 20.5 (68.9) | 17.0 (62.6) | 13.7 (56.7) | 20.1 (68.2) |
| Record low °C (°F) | 1.6 (34.9) | 5.8 (42.4) | 8.7 (47.7) | 14.1 (57.4) | 16.6 (61.9) | 21.2 (70.2) | 21.2 (70.2) | 19.5 (67.1) | 17.1 (62.8) | 12.0 (53.6) | 9.0 (48.2) | 5.0 (41.0) | 1.6 (34.9) |
| Average precipitation mm (inches) | 0.7 (0.03) | 8.3 (0.33) | 17.1 (0.67) | 11.4 (0.45) | 0.0 (0.0) | 11.6 (0.46) | 0.1 (0.00) | 5.2 (0.20) | 0.0 (0.0) | 0.0 (0.0) | 0.0 (0.0) | 0.6 (0.02) | 55 (2.16) |
| Average precipitation days (≥ 1.0 mm) | 0.1 | 0.0 | 0.5 | 0.2 | 0.2 | 0.2 | 0.1 | 0.1 | 0.1 | 0.3 | 0.1 | 0.1 | 2 |
| Average relative humidity (%) | 54 | 53 | 46 | 41 | 43 | 44 | 63 | 58 | 51 | 41 | 47 | 54 | 50 |
Source 1: NOAA (preciptiation and humidity 1980–1990)
Source 2: Starlings Roost Weather

== See also ==
- List of cities in Oman
