= Ken Perkins =

British Army general

Major-General Ken Perkins CB MBE DFC
- Born: 15 August 1926; Newhaven, England
- Died: 23 October 2009 (aged 83); Marlborough, England
- Military career
- Allegiance: United Kingdom
- Branch: British Army
- Service years: 1946–1982
- Rank: Major-General
- Unit: Royal Artillery
- Commands: 1 Royal Horse Artillery; 24 Air Portable Brigade 1969–1970; Commander Sultan of Oman's Armed Forces 1975–1977
- Conflicts: Palestine; Suez; Korea; Malaya; Dhofar Rebellion; Northern Ireland
- Awards: CB; MBE; DFC; DCM (Selangor); Hashemite Order of Independence; Order of Oman
- Other work: Defence correspondent for The Sun newspaper

Major-General Kenneth Perkins CB MBE DFC (15 August 1926 – 23 October 2009) was a British Army officer who became commander of the Sultan of Oman's Armed Forces taking over from General Sir Timothy Creasey.

His career highlights included:

- On 1 November 1947 Ken Perkins was promoted 2nd Lieutenant to Lieutenant.
- On 15 August 1953 Ken Perkins was promoted to Captain.
- On 25 October 1955 Captain Ken Perkins DFC (Army number 369841) was awarded the MBE.
- In 1958 Ken Perkins attended the Pakistani Army staff College in Quetta.
- On 30 June 1967 Ken Perkins was promoted to lieutenant colonel.
- Between December 1973 and January 1975 Director of Defence Operational Plans(Defence Operations) as a brigadier.
- On 21 April 1975 Brigadier (Acting Major General) Perkins was confirmed as Major General, with seniority 8 April 1974.
- Major General Perkins was Commander Sultan of Oman's Armed Force 1975–1977.
- On 16 June 1977 Major General Perkins appointed Assistant Chief of Defence Staff (Operations), Ministry of Defence; and nearing the end of his time in post in 1980 he deployed to the infant state of Zimbabwe to try and assist in the integration of the new Zimbabwean Armed Forces, bringing in former anti-Rhodesian rebels with the residual military.
- The 1977 Silver Jubilee and Birthday Honours made Ken Perkins a Companion of the Bath (CB)
- At the end of his military career he held the post of Director of Military Assistance Overseas from April 1980 to April 1982.

== Gallery ==
The Sultanate of Oman's location
