= Battle of Mirbat =

1972 operation during the Dhofar Rebellion

- Part of Dhofar Rebellion
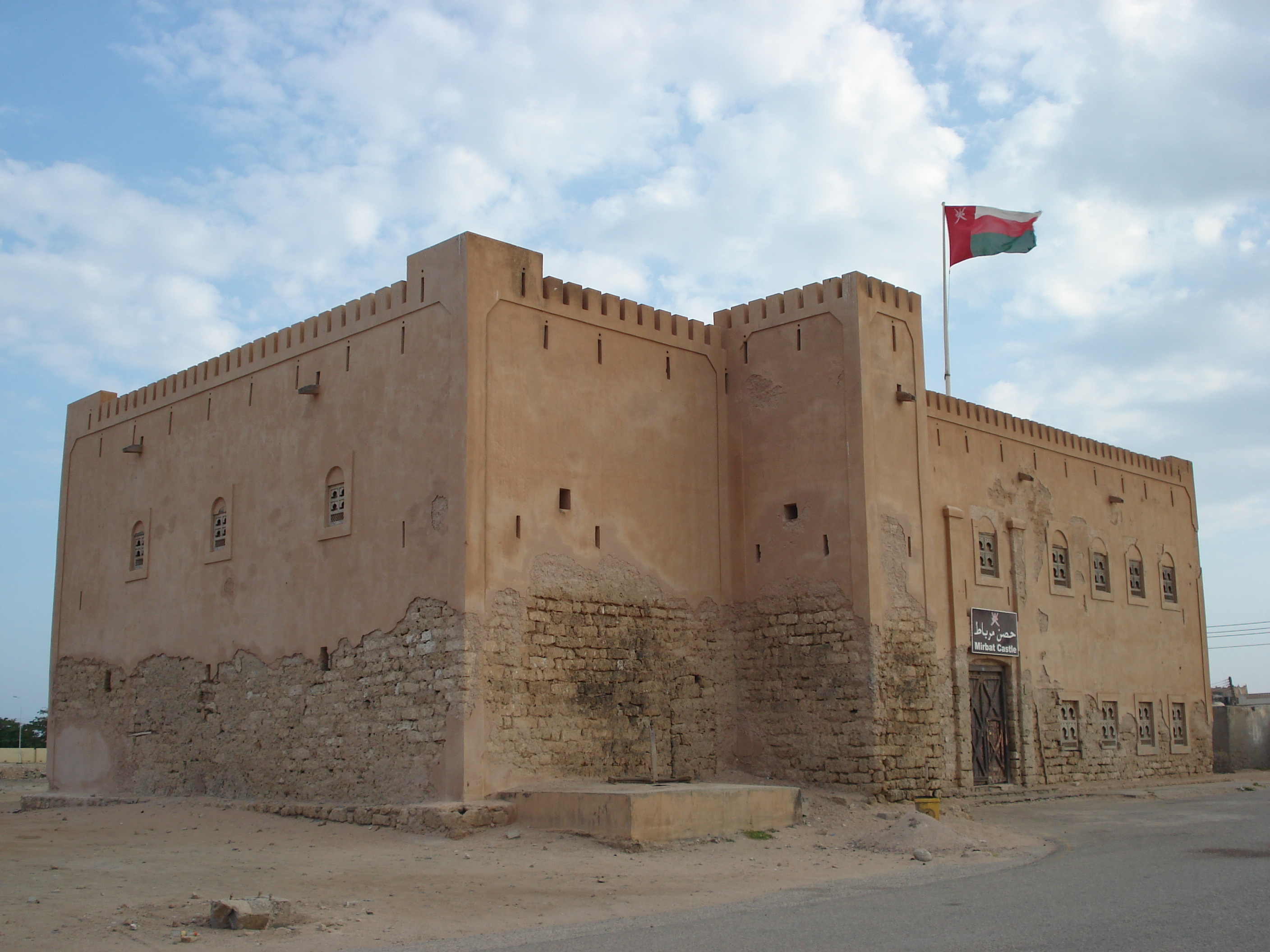
- The Wali's Fort. The Battle centred on the Dhofar Gendarmerie fort (not shown)
Date	19 July 1972
Location	Mirbat, Dhofar 16°59′33″N 54°41′31″E
Result	British–Omani victory

Belligerents
United Kingdom; Oman	Popular Front for the Liberation of the Occupied Arabian Gulf (PFLOAG)

Commanders and leaders
Mike Kealy	Salim Musalim †

Strength
10 British soldiers (9 SAS, 1 Int Corps); 25 men from Omani Gendarmerie; 30 Balochi Askari; 60 soldiers of a local firqat 12 BAC Strikemaster light attack jets 21 SAS reinforcements 3 helicopters	200–300 guerrillas

Casualties and losses
2 SAS soldiers killed 2 Gendarmes killed 1 jet damaged	38 - 80 killed 12 captured

The Battle of Mirbat (19 July 1972) was an attack by the Popular Front for the Liberation of the Occupied Arabian Gulf (PFLOAG) targeting an Omani government position in the town of Mirbat, Oman. During the Dhofar Rebellion, Britain assisted the Omani government, an absolute monarchy, by sending elements of its Special Air Service (SAS) both to train soldiers and fight against the PFLOAG guerrillas. The assault was defeated after the arrival of several BAC Strikemaster attack aircraft belonging to Oman, firing rockets at PFLOAG's positions, which forced the guerrillas to retreat. After the battle the British and their allies recovered the corpses of the attacking guerrillas, some were put on public display as a tool of terror, to act as warnings to potential left-wing rebels who were tempted to join the rebellion against Oman's government.

== Background ==
In 1963 a revolution began in Oman which sought to topple the government of the Sultunate of Muscat and Oman, which was backed by the United Kingdom. During the revolution, a communist guerrilla organisation was founded in 1968 called the Popular Front for the Liberation of the Occupied Arabian Gulf (PFLOAG). The PFLOAG sought to establish an independent and democratic republic with a socialist economy.

== Battle ==
At 6am on 19 July 1972 the PFLOAG guerrillas attacked the British Army Training Team (BATT) house based just outside the Port of Mirbat which housed nine SAS soldiers, the guerrillas knowing that to be able to reach the Port of Mirbat they would first have to defeat the SAS guarding the approach to the town in Jebel Ali, a series of small desert slopes leading to the Port.

The Officer in Command, Captain Mike Kealy, observed the waves advancing on the fort, but at first did not order his men to open fire because he thought it was the "Night Picket" coming back from night shift. The Night Picket were soldiers from the Omani Army positioned on the slopes to warn the BATT house of guerrilla movements. Realising that the Night Picket must have been killed, Kealy ordered his men to open fire. Kealy and other members of the team took up positions behind the sand-bag parapet on the roof of the BATT house, firing at the guerrillas with L1A1 SLR battle rifles, with one man firing the Browning M2HB heavy machine gun, with a further two men on ground level operating and firing an infantry mortar surrounded by sand-bags. The PFLOAG guerrillas were armed with AK-47 assault rifles, and were mortar bombing the area around the BATT house. Kealy ordered the signaller to establish communications with SAS Headquarters at Um al Quarif, to request reinforcements.

There were also a small number of Omani Intelligence Service personnel in the BATT House, a small contingent of Pakistani soldiers and a member of British Military Intelligence seconded to the OIS. They joined the team on the roof and fired on the attackers. Initially some of the Pakistani soldiers were reluctant to join the defence of the fort because their roles with the BATT were largely administrative, but they obeyed orders from Mike Kealy and the British Military Intelligence Corporal.

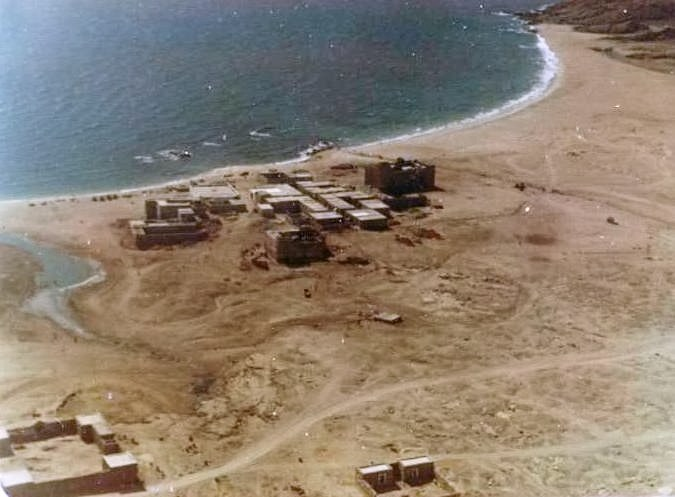
Overflying the BATT House, Mirbat.

Knowing that their battle rifles would not be of full use until the guerrillas were closer than the weapon's range of 800 metres, and lacking heavier firepower, Sergeant Talaiasi Labalaba made a run for the 25 Pounder Artillery Piece, which was positioned next to a smaller fort manned by nine Omani Army Special Forces soldiers, who had not played a part in the battle. The Omani policeman who was guarding the weapon had been seriously wounded. Talaiasi Labalaba managed to operate the weapon by himself and fire a round a minute at the approaching guerrillas, directing their attention away from the BATT house. Kealy received a radio message from Talaiasi reporting that a bullet had hit his chin. At the BATT house Kealy asked for a volunteer to run to Talaiasi's aid. Trooper Sekonaia Takavesi volunteered to go.

Sekonaia Takavesi ran the 800 metres through heavy gunfire, and reached the gun emplacement. Sekonaia tried to give aid to his injured friend, while firing at the approaching guerrillas with his personal weapon. Realising that they needed help, Sekonaia tried to raise the small number of Omani soldiers inside the smaller fort, and Walid Khamis emerged. The remaining Omani soldiers in the fort engaged the enemy with small arms fire from firing positions on the roof and through the windows of the fort. As the two men made it back to the emplacement, the Omani soldier fell after being shot in the stomach. PFLOAG guerrillas continued to advance upon both the BATT house and the artillery emplacement, at one point so close that Sekonaia and Talaiasi fired the weapon at point-blank range, aiming down the barrel. Talaiasi crawled across a small space to reach a 60 mm infantry mortar, but fell dead after being shot in the neck. Sekonaia, also shot through the shoulder and grazed by a bullet to the back of his head, continued to fire at the guerrillas with his personal weapon. The squad signaller sent messages through to the main Forward Operating Base, to request air support and medical evacuation for the men in the gun emplacement.

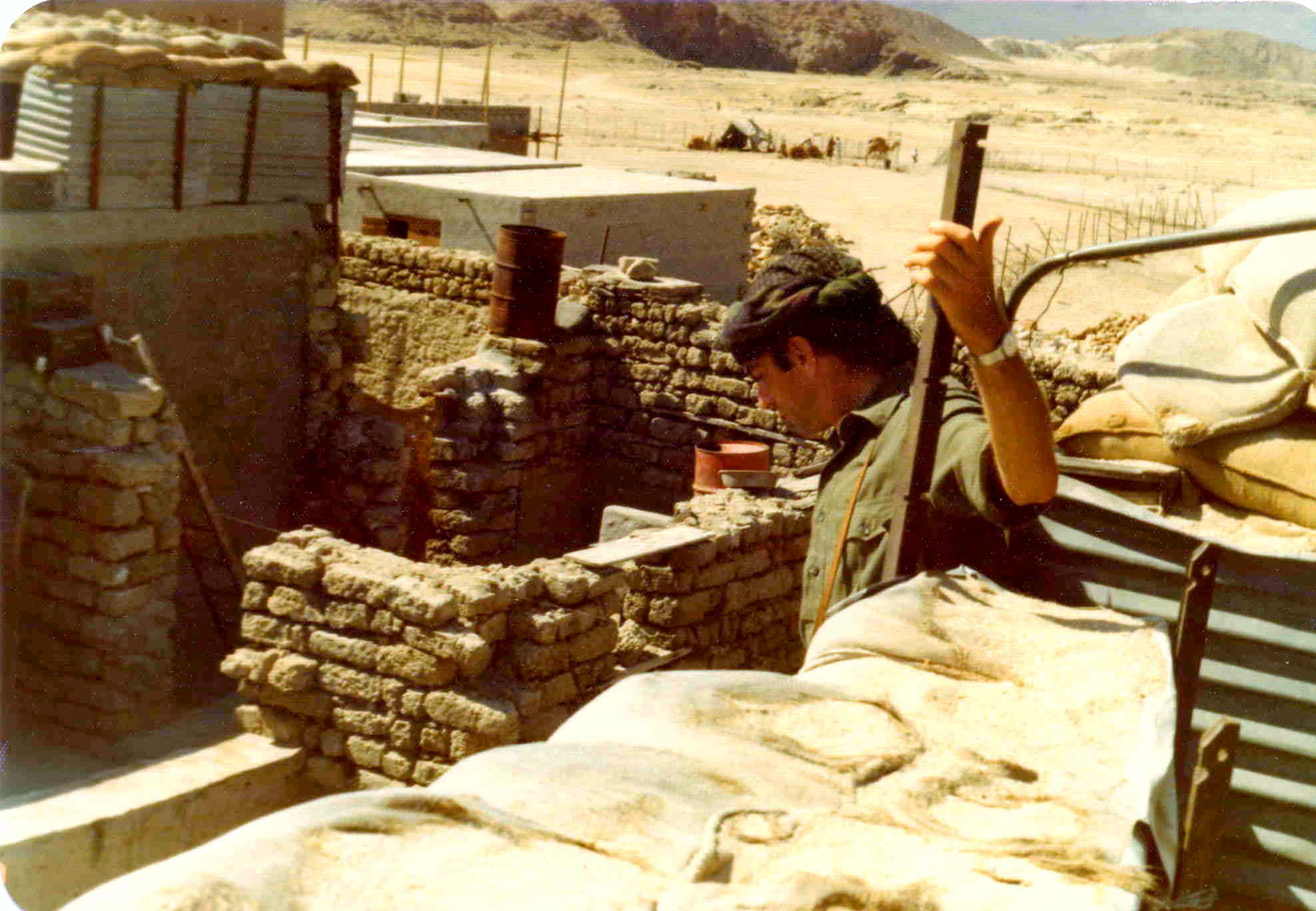
Inside the BATT House at Mirbat

Captain Kealy and Trooper Tobin made a run to the artillery piece, and dived in. Sekonaia continued to fire on the attackers, propped up against sand bags after being shot through the stomach (the bullet narrowly missing his spine). The PFLOAG threw several hand grenades, but only one detonated, exploding behind the emplacement with no one injured. During the battle, Trooper Tobin attempted to reach over the body of Talaiasi. In so doing, Tobin was mortally wounded when a bullet struck his face. By this time, BAC Strikemaster light-attack jets of the Sultan of Oman's Air Force had arrived and began strafing the PFLOAG in the Jebel Ali. With a low cloud base making for low-altitude attack runs, only machine-guns and light rockets were used. One of the Strikemasters was sufficiently damaged by PFLOAG fire that it had to return to base before using up all its weapons. Reinforcements arrived from G Squadron and, defeated, the PFLOAG attackers withdrew at about 12:30. All wounded SAS troopers were evacuated, and given medical treatment. Trooper Tobin eventually died in hospital, due to the gunshot wound to his face.

== Aftermath ==
After the battle the Omani and British managed to recover the corpses of 38 PFLOAG guerrillas who had attacked Mirbat. Casualties in total for the PFLOAG were likely more around eighty, but some reports considered that the number of PFLOAG casualties was likely to have been as high as 200. Some of these corpses were taken to be put on public display and used as tools of terror and act as warnings to anyone who would resist the Sultan.

=== 25-pounder gun ===
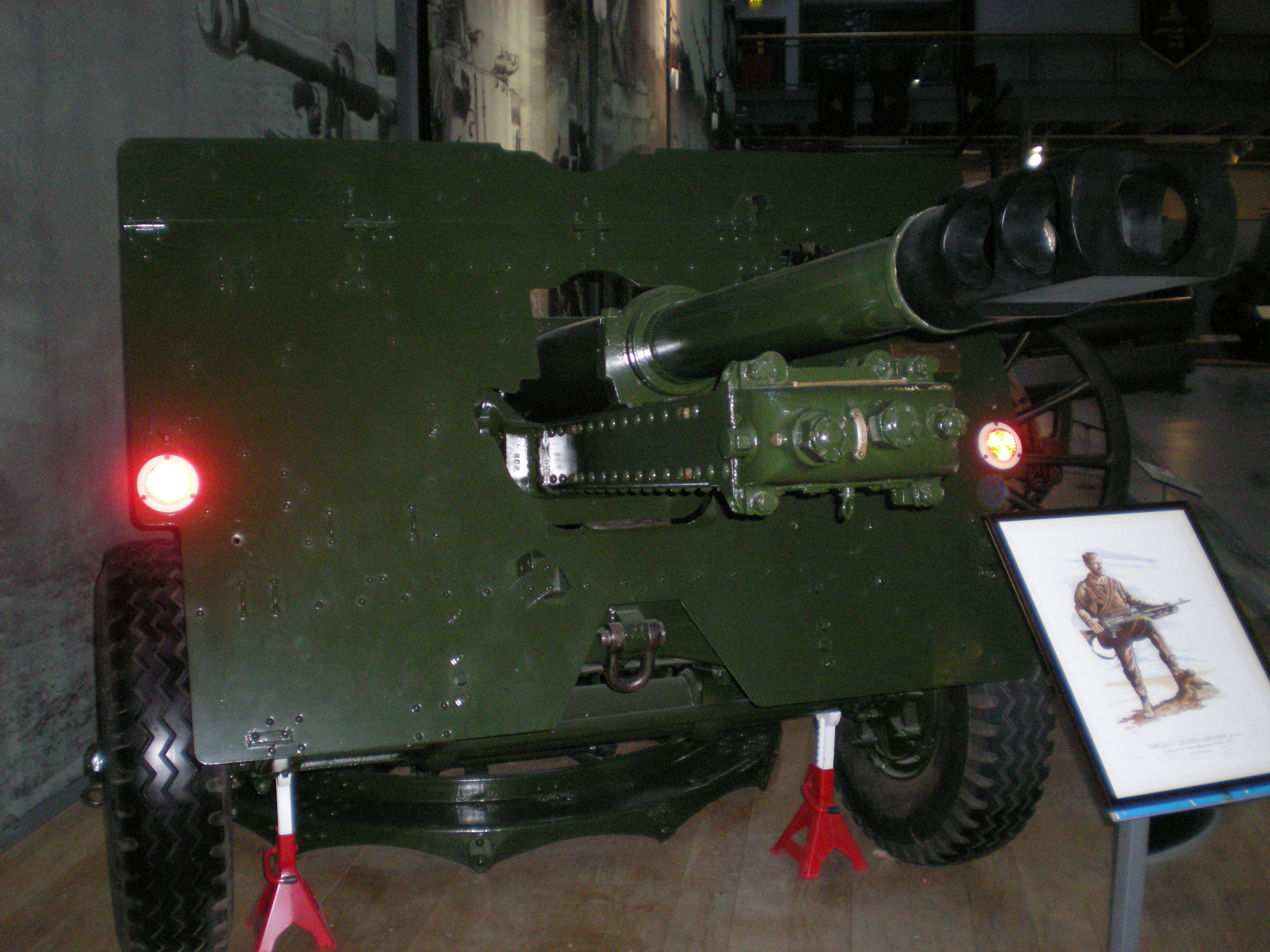
"Mirbat gun" at the Firepower museum of the Royal Artillery

The 25-pounder gun (now known as the "Mirbat gun") used by Fijian Sergeant Talaiasi Labalaba during the siege was previously housed in the Firepower museum of the Royal Artillery at the former Royal Arsenal, Woolwich. Before being killed in action, Sgt Labalaba singlehandedly operated the 25-pounder gun, a weapon normally requiring four to six soldiers to operate. Labalaba's actions were a key factor in halting the PFLOAG's assault on the emplacement, allowing time for reinforcements to arrive. Labalaba was posthumously awarded a Mention in Dispatches for his actions during the Battle of Mirbat, though some of his comrades have since campaigned for him to be awarded the more prestigious Victoria Cross.

=== British medals and awards ===
Kealy received the Distinguished Service Order, Takavesi the Distinguished Conduct Medal, Bennett the Military Medal. These were announced three years after the event. An Omani from the fort, Walid Khamis, was injured during the battle and received the Sultan's Gallantry Medal - Oman's highest award. The British Military Intelligence Corporal received a medal for gallantry from the Sultan (for this action and others), but was threatened with disciplinary action by the British Army for being directly involved in the action at Mirbat.

== In popular culture ==
- Sir Ranulph Fiennes alleged in his book The Feather Men that Mike Kealy was murdered years later in the Brecon Beacons by an Arab militant cell. However, the circumstances of Kealy's death suggest that this is somewhat fanciful, as he was seen by other service personnel undergoing the same SAS endurance exercise only a few hours beforehand in deteriorating weather conditions, and was in fact found alive (but in poor condition) by a two-man search party, one of whom stayed with him and attempted to keep him warm. It was later acknowledged by the Coroner that one of the major contributory factors to his death was the delay of some 19 hours in recovering him from the hillside. Subsequently, the author admitted the book was fiction and that no such assassinations ever took place.
- The battle is briefly depicted in the 2011 film Killer Elite, where it is central to the plot. The film is based on Fiennes' fictional book.
- The battle is also mentioned by Frederick Forsyth in his book The Veteran, where a member of the SAS team is murdered by two criminals 30 years after the engagement.
- The battle is referred to in Chris Ryan's "Land of Fire", but is called "The Battle of Merbak", the PFLOAG are numbered in the thousands and Laba is replaced by a character called Tom who is wounded but lives.
- The battle is described in Rowland White's Storm Front.
- The battle is also used as inspiration in the 2018 short film "The Daycare".
- The battle is referred to in J K Rowling's book The Hallmarked Man, a part of the Cormoran Strike Series

== British troops present ==
The following SAS troopers were present at Mirbat on 19 July 1972:

- Captain Mike Kealy
- Staff Sergeant Talaiasi "Laba" Labalaba (Killed in action)
- Sergeant Bob Bennett
- Corporal Roger Cole
- Corporal Jeff Taylor
- Lance Corporal Pete Warne (also known as Pete Wignall, Pete Winner & Soldier I, nickname Snapper)
- Trooper Sekonaia "Tak" Takavesi
- Trooper Thomas Tobin (Died of wounds)
- Trooper Austin "Fuzz" Hussey

== See also ==
- Dhofar Rebellion
- Oman
- PFLOAG
