= Oliver Shepard =

British explorer (born 1946)

Oliver Shepard (born 1946) is a British explorer. He participated in the Transglobe Expedition, the first expedition to circumnavigate the globe from pole to pole.

Shepard was educated at Heatherdown School, near Ascot in Berkshire, followed by Eton College (also in Berkshire). In 1964, he was commissioned into the Coldstream Guards, after which he joined 21 Regiment Special Air Service (Artists). His civilian career started at the Charrington Brewery in the East End of London in 1968. In 1975 he joined Sir Ranulph Fiennes and his wife Ginny at the Duke of York Barracks, Chelsea. Between 1975 and 1979, he worked on preparations for the Transglobe Expedition. He went with members of the group to Scotland in 1975, followed by Exercise Greenland in 1976, and the British North Pole Expedition in 1977. On the Transglobe Expedition he travelled with Fiennes and Charlie Burton on the 67-day Antarctic crossing, and acted as doctor, dentist, scientist and mechanic. Because of family problems, he returned to the UK after the South Pole crossing, and worked in the office in London. Following Transglobe, Shepard was involved in a number of further polar expeditions, and also organised the trans-Antarctic crossing undertaken by Fiennes and Mike Stroud. In later life he supported the Army Cadet Force (ACF) and the ABF, including sharing his experiences and his knowledge.

== See also ==
- Charlie Burton
- Ginny Fiennes
