= Gary McKendry =

Northern Irish film and television commercial director

- Born: Ballyclare, County Antrim, Northern Ireland
- Education: Belfast College of Art; Central Saint Martins College of Art and Design
- Occupation: Commercial director

Gary McKendry is a Northern Irish film and television commercial director. His short film Everything in This Country Must was nominated for an Academy Award in 2005.

== Biography ==
McKendry was born and raised in Ballyclare, County Antrim, Northern Ireland. He attended the Belfast College of Art for a year before enrolling at Central Saint Martins College of Art and Design in London. Graduating with a degree in art and film, McKendry worked as a storyboard artist in London, before moving to Australia where he worked as an advertising art director. He was offered a job with the American ad agency Chiat/Day and moved to New York City, where he later worked for Ogilvy & Mather and Margeotes Fertitta.

Eventually McKendry branched out on his own, founding the company Go Film and directing award-winning commercials for clients such as IKEA. Porsche, Heineken, NASDAQ, Budweiser and DeBeers. He was interviewed by BBC Radio Ulster after witnessing the 11 September attacks in 2001.

McKendry decided to direct Everything in This Country Must after reading the novella by Colum McCann. He spent much of 2003 shooting the film on location in Northern Ireland. The film was nominated for the Academy Award for Best Live Action Short Film in the 77th Academy Awards, which was won by Andrea Arnold's film Wasp.

McKendry's debut feature film was Killer Elite, an action thriller based on Sir Ranulph Fiennes' fiction novel The Feather Men. It was filmed in Australia and starred Jason Statham, Clive Owen, and Robert De Niro. In 2011, it was announced that McKendry would direct the first film of a three-picture financing deal between Palomar Pictures and Grosvenor Park Productions. The film, Joseph and the Girl, will be a remake of the 2010 French heist thriller Joseph et la Fille.
