= Talaiasi Labalaba =

British-Fijian SAS soldier in the Battle of Mirbat

Talaiasi Labalaba BEM
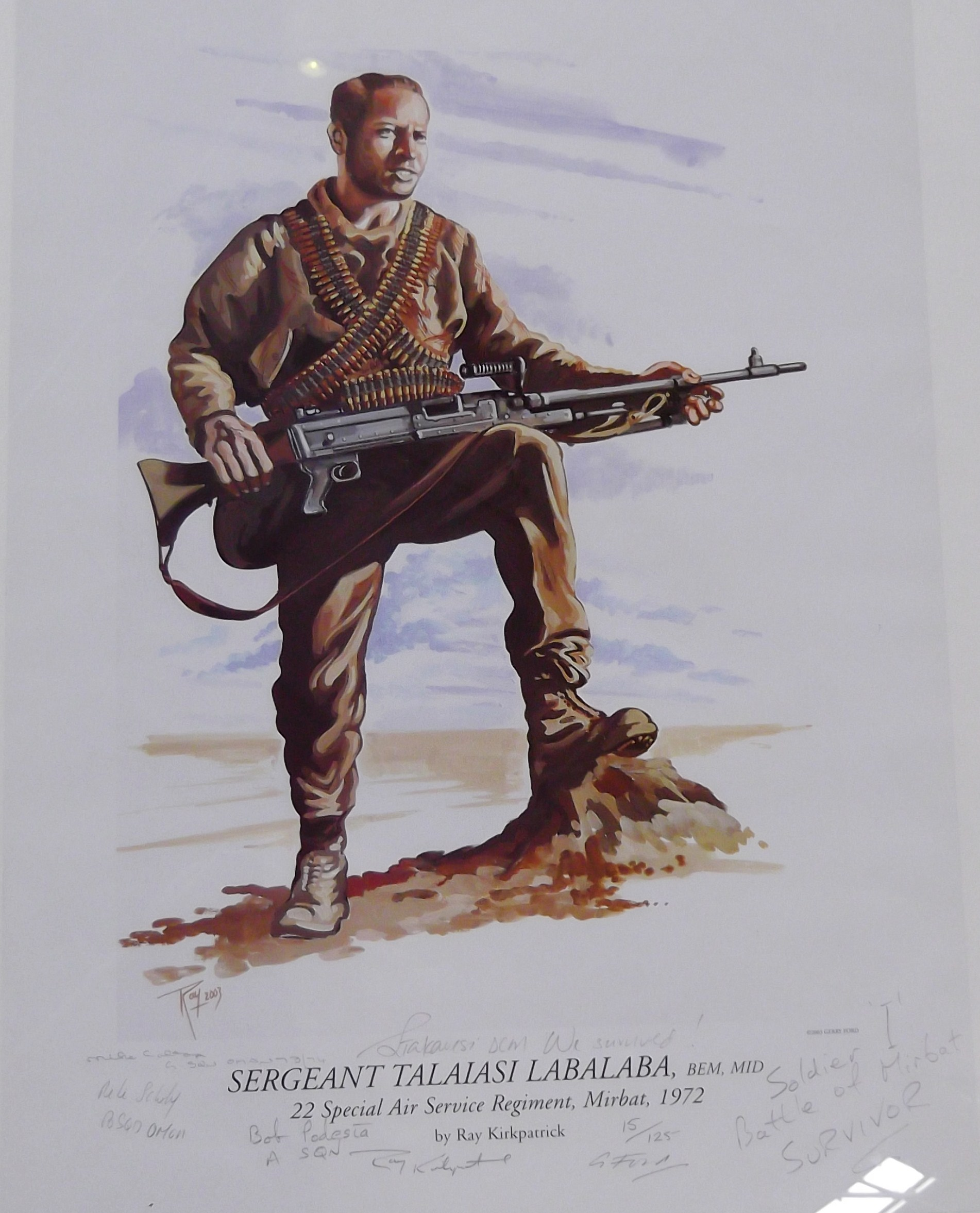
- Memorial to Sergeant Labalaba at the Royal Artillery Museum, London
- Born: 13 July 1942; Fiji
- Died: 19 July 1972 (aged 30); Mirbat, Oman
- Military career
- Allegiance: United Kingdom
- Branch: British Army
- Service years: 1960–1972
- Rank: Sergeant
- Nickname: "Laba"
- Service number: 23892771
- Units: Royal Ulster Rifles; Royal Irish Rangers; Special Air Service
- Conflicts: Aden Emergency; Dhofar Rebellion: Battle of Mirbat
- Awards: British Empire Medal; Mentioned in Despatches

Talaiasi Labalaba BEM (13 July 1942 – 19 July 1972) was a British-Fijian sergeant in the SAS who was involved in the Battle of Mirbat on 19 July 1972. Labalaba initially served in the British Army in the Royal Ulster Rifles.

== Battle of Mirbat ==
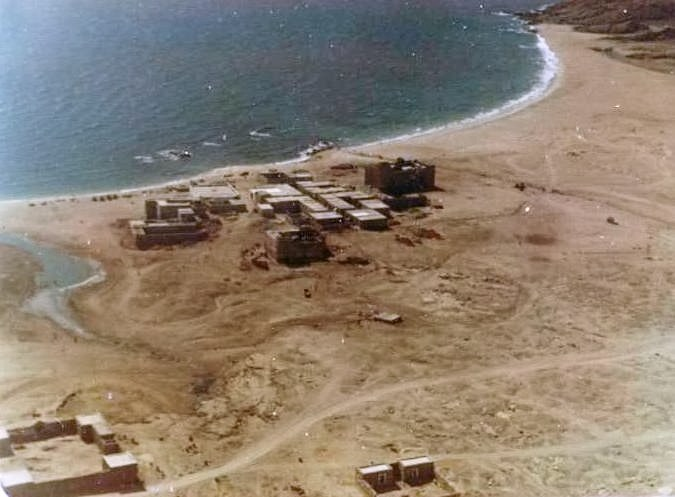
The BATT House at Mirbat from the air

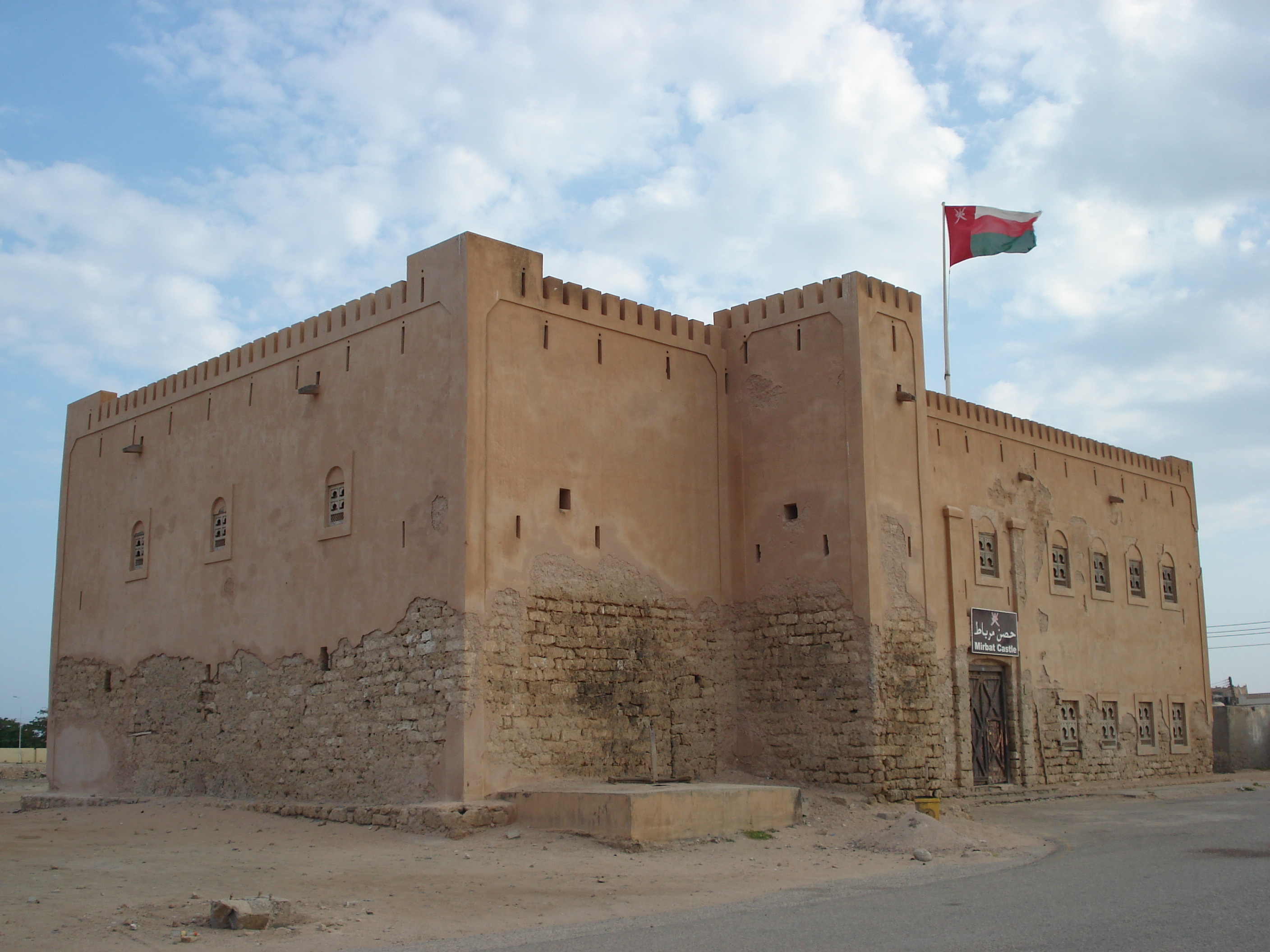
Mirbat Fort as it is today, the scene of the siege

On 19 July 1972, the Popular Front for the Liberation of the Occupied Arabian Gulf (PFLOAG) attacked the British Army Training Team (BATT) house, which housed nine SAS soldiers, based just outside the port of Mirbat, Oman.

Labalaba, aged 30, was shot dead in the neck whilst firing a 25-pounder gun at the attacking guerrilla forces.

He displayed notable bravery by continuing to fire the 25 pounder single-handed in spite of being seriously wounded when a bullet hit him in the face, after his Omani loader was seriously wounded early in the battle. Captain Mike Kealy, fellow Sergeant Tommy Goodyear and Trooper Sekonaia Takavesi ran a gauntlet of enemy fire but arrived too late to save Labalaba. The trooper was also hit, Takavesi was wounded in the shoulder, head, and stomach while Dunkley was killed when a round penetrated the sand-bagged walls and hit him in the face. Labalaba's actions helped to keep the insurgents pinned down until Strikemaster jets of the SOAF arrived to drive back the attackers while reinforcements from Salalah could be organised.

In his book of the battle, SAS: Operation Storm, fellow SAS trooper Roger Cole paid tribute to Labalaba saying "if the guerrilla force had taken the 25-pounder, then the SAS would have lost the battle."

== Honours ==
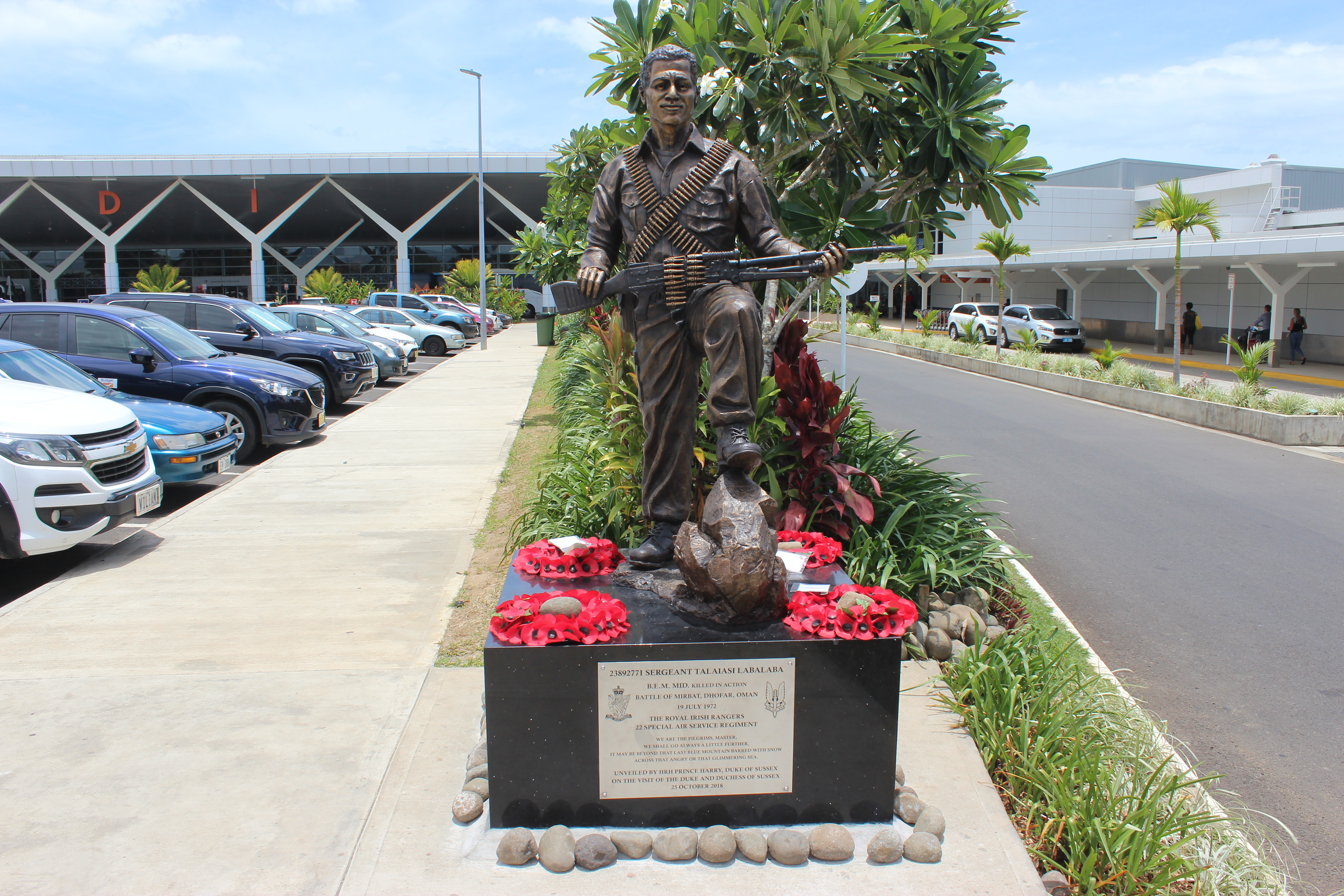
Statue at Nadi International Airport

Labalaba was awarded a posthumous Mention in Despatches for his actions in the Battle of Mirbat, although some of his former comrades have campaigned for him to be awarded the more prestigious Victoria Cross. His body was returned to England and buried in the cemetery at St Martin's Church, Hereford.

In 2012 he was chosen as one of BBC Radio 4's 60 New Elizabethans in celebration of Queen Elizabeth's Diamond Jubilee.

A statue of Labalaba was erected in 2009 at the SAS headquarters in Herefordshire, and another, at Nadi International Airport in Fiji, dedicated in 2018 during a visit by the Duke and Duchess of Sussex.
