= Bothie =

Bothie may refer to:

- Bothie, the polar explorer dog
- Bothy, a shelter
