= Twisleton-Wykeham-Fiennes baronets =

Baronetcy in the Baronetage of the United Kingdom

Baronetcy of Twisleton-Wykeham-Fiennes
- Quarterly, 1st & 4th: Azure, three lions rampant or (for Fiennes); 2nd & 3rd: Argent, a chevron between three moles sable (for Twisleton) overall a canton of a baronet
- Creation date: 30 June 1916
- Created by: George V
- Baronetage: Baronetage of the United Kingdom
- First holder: Sir Eustace Twisleton-Wykeham-Fiennes
- Present holder: Sir Ranulph Twisleton-Wykeham-Fiennes, 3rd Baronet
- Remainder to: 1st baronet's heirs male of the body lawfully begotten
- Status: Extant
- Motto: Fortem posce animum (Look for a brave spirit)

The Twisleton-Wykeham-Fiennes Baronetcy, of Banbury in the County of Oxford, is a title in the Baronetage of the United Kingdom. It was created in the 1916 Birthday Honours for the Liberal politician and decorated military officer the Hon. Eustace Twisleton-Wykeham-Fiennes.

Sir Eustace was the second son of John Twisleton-Wykeham-Fiennes, 11th/17th Baron Saye and Sele. He had a long military career and represented Banbury in Parliament (1906–10, 1910–18). At the time of the creation, he was a major in the Oxfordshire Yeomanry serving in the First World War. He was later a lieutenant-colonel and colonial administrator.

Sir Eustace's eldest son and heir, Capt. John Eustace Twisleton-Wykeham-Fiennes, died 18 June 1917 of wounds suffered in the Battle of Arras, where he was serving with the Gordon Highlanders. Following Sir Eustace's death in February 1943, the title was inherited by his second son, Lt.-Col. Sir Ranulph Twisleton-Wykeham-Fiennes, at the time serving in Italy with the Royal Scots Greys.

The second baronet married Audrey Joan Wilson, daughter of Sir Percy Newson, in 1931. They had three daughters when, still on active service in Italy, he trod on a land mine and was seriously injured. He died shortly afterwards, on 24 November 1943. The third baronet, Ranulph Twisleton-Wykeham-Fiennes, was born posthumously in March 1944. He is a well-known adventurer and producer. He married fellow adventurer Virginia Pepper in 1970. She died of cancer in 2004. There are no heirs to the title.

== Twisleton-Wykeham-Fiennes baronets (1916) ==
- Eustace Fiennes, 1st Baronet (1864–1943)
  - † Capt. John Eustace Twisleton-Wykeham-Fiennes (1895–1917)
  - † Sir Ranulph Twisleton-Wykeham-Fiennes, 2nd Baronet (1902–1943)
    - Sir Ranulph Twisleton-Wykeham-Fiennes, 3rd Baronet (born 1944)

== See also ==
- Twisleton-Wykeham-Fiennes family
- Baron Saye and Sele
