= Bothie (dog) =

Canine polar explorer

- Species: Canis familiaris
- Breed: Jack Russell Terrier
- Sex: Male
- Occupation: Polar explorer
- Owners: Ranulph Fiennes and Ginny Fiennes

Bothie, also known as Bothie the Polar Dog, was a long-haired Jack Russell Terrier who was the only dog to travel to both the South and North Poles. Bothie was owned by Ranulph Fiennes and Ginny Fiennes and accompanied the team on the circumpolar Transglobe Expedition from 1979 to 1982.

== Expedition ==
The Transglobe Expedition (1979–1982) was the first successful longitudinal (north–south) circumnavigation of the Earth using only surface transport, traversing both the South and North Poles. The expedition was conceived by Ginny Fiennes and led by her husband Ranulph Fiennes.

Bothie, a stray long-haired brown-and-white Jack Russell Terrier, was given to the Fiennes couple in 1977, two years before the expedition. He was flown to join the Transglobe crew following the Africa segment, which was considered too hot for him.

Bothie accompanied Ginny Fiennes throughout the rest of the expedition. This included enduring an Antarctic winter during his nine-month stay on the continent, and spending six weeks at the pole. During this period Bothie participated in the first cricket match ever held at the South Pole. To help him with the cold temperatures Bothie was kitted with tailor-made red coat, balaclava facemask, and boots, though he was said to consider these as "seldom needed".

From Antarctica the team sailed north on the MV Benjamin Bowring to Canada. After travelling through the Northwest Passage Ranulph Fiennes and Charles Burton made the trip to the North Pole by powered sledges arriving 10 April 1982, before signalling to base camp that they had arrived. To celebrate their achievement, a Twin Otter aircraft was sent out to deliver the two men supplies, including champagne, as well as Bothie. At this point Bothie became the first dog to ever "set paw on both the South and North poles".

During the three-year expedition, Bothie was considered by members of the team as "a friend and welcome distraction to everyone", bringing a "sense of home and normality" to the venture.

== Return ==
Upon return to Great Britain, following a six-month anti-rabies quarantine, Bothie achieved a level of celebrity including featuring on the Blue Peter TV programme, being voted Great Britain's Pet of the Year and presented a prize at Crufts in 1983, inspiring a soft-toy range, and entry into the Guinness Book of Pet Records. In 1984, Ranulph and Ginny Fiennes released a best-selling book on his adventures called Bothie The Polar Dog.

Following his return, Bothie retired from polar exploration aged 7 years.

== Legacy ==
No other canine is expected to match Bothie's achievement of visiting both poles after the Antarctic Treaty of 1994, which has subsequently forbidden dogs from the Antarctic continent to protect the native seal population.

== See also ==
- List of individual dogs
