= William Kronick =

American film director

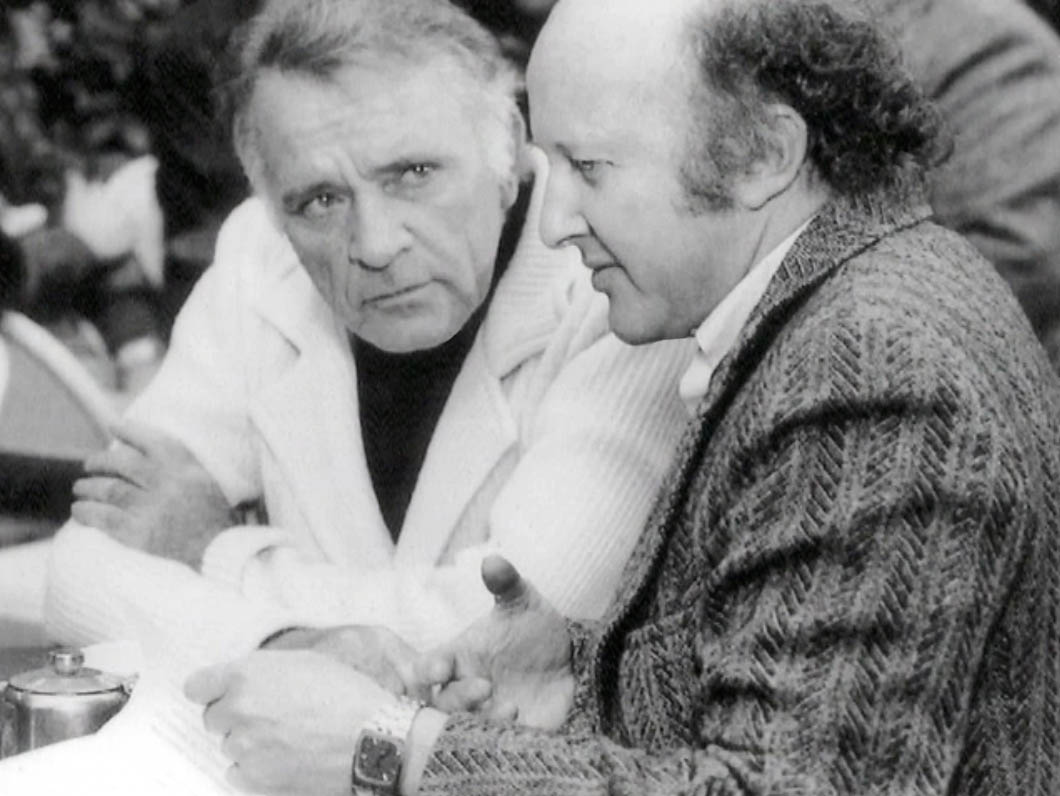
- Kronick on location with Richard Burton during the filming of To the Ends of the Earth.
- Born: Amsterdam, New York, US
- Education: Columbia University
- Occupations: Film writer; director; producer; novelist

William Kronick (born 1934) is an American film and television writer, director and producer. He worked in the film industry from 1960 to 2000, when he segued into writing novels.

== Biography ==
Born to European emigrants, William Kronick grew up in Amsterdam, New York. He attended Columbia College where he was active in the Columbia Players’ stage productions. He also helped form The Gilbert and Sullivan Society at Barnard College.

After graduation Kronick was drafted into the U.S. Navy where he became a Photographer's Mate. During a North Atlantic exercise in Stockholm, Sweden Kronick met film and theater director Alf Sjoberg who arranged for Kronick, once out of the Navy, to apprentice with Ingmar Bergman on his next film The Magician.

Returning to New York Kronick found a job as Production Assistant with Louis de Rochemont Associates. So began his professional career in motion pictures.

Kronick's first film was a twenty-four-minute comedy, A Bowl of Cherries. The film, which played in a thousand art theaters in the U.S. and Europe, was seen by TV documentary producer, David L. Wolper. He offered Kronick the producing/directing/writing position on a new reality series, Story of….

During his long career, Kronick would make some of the highest-rated Network Specials, including Alaska! (National Geographic), Plimpton! and Mysteries of the Great Pyramid. He directed The Five-Hundred Pound Jerk, a popular Movie-of-the-Week.

His first feature, independently financed, was A Likely Story (a.k.a. Horowitz in Dublin) filmed entirely in Ireland. It featured Harvey Lembeck, Al Lettieri and Sinéad Cusack. Kronick also did long-term stints as Second Unit Director on features such as King Kong (1976) and Flash Gordon (1980), on which he was responsible for many action and special effects sequences.

Another major film project was the feature-length documentary To The Ends Of The Earth, which recorded the unique three-year expedition of three Englishmen who set out to circumnavigate the globe, crossing both the South and North Poles without leaving the surface of the earth. Known as the Transglobe Expedition, Prince Charles was its patron with Richard Burton narrating and hosting the film. Kronick received a Special Certificate of Merit from the Academy of Motion Pictures Arts and Sciences for this film.

He continued to produce, write and direct Network and Cable specials until 2000, when he turned to writing novels. To date he has completed six contemporary morality tales dealing mainly with film and theater.

He has been married and divorced twice and has a son, Max. Kronick resides in Los Angeles.

== Career ==
=== Filmography ===
Directing Credits

| Year | Show |
|---|---|
| 1999 | The Man Who Makes Things Happen: David L. Wolper |
| 1991 | The Journey Back: Professionals Recover From Addiction |
| 1988 | The World's Greatest Stunts: A Tribute to Hollywood Stuntmen |
| 1987 | The Ultimate Stuntman: A Tribute to Dar Robinson |
| 1983 | To the Ends of the Earth |
| 1983 | Ripley's Believe It Or Not! |
| 1980 | Flash Gordon (Second Unit Director) |
| 1977 | Mysteries of the Great Pyramid |
| 1976 | King Kong (Second Unit Director) |
| 1973 | A Likely Story (a.k.a. Horowitz in Dublin) |
| 1973 | The 500 Pound Jerk |
| 1970-72 | Plimpton! Specials |
| 1970 | Flap (Second Unit Director) |
| 1969 | The Bridge at Remagen (Second Unit Director) |
| 1967 | National Geographic Special: Alaska! |
| 1965 | Time-Life Special: The Class of '49 |
| 1965 | Race for the Moon |
| 1964 | Krebiozen and Cancer: Thirteen Years of Bitter Conflict |
| 1964 | Hollywood and the Stars: On Location: Night of the Iguana |
| 1962-63 | Story Of... |
| 1961 | A Bowl of Cherries |

Writing Credits

| Year | Show |
|---|---|
| 1999 | Celebrate the Century |
| 1999 | The Man Who Makes Things Happen: David L. Wolper |
| 1991 | The Journey Back: Professionals Recover From Addiction |
| 1988 | The World's Greatest Stunts: A Tribute to Hollywood Stuntmen |
| 1987 | Nights in White Satin |
| 1987 | The Ultimate Stuntman: A Tribute to Dar Robinson |
| 1981 | Great Movie Stunts: Raiders of the Lost Ark |
| 1977 | Mysteries of the Great Pyramid |
| 1973 | A Likely Story (a.k.a. Horowitz in Dublin) |
| 1970-72 | Plimpton! Specials |
| 1967 | National Geographic Special: Alaska! |
| 1965 | Time-Life Special: The Class of '49 |
| 1965 | Race for the Moon |
| 1964 | Krebiozen and Cancer: Thirteen Years of Bitter Conflict |
| 1964 | Hollywood and the Stars: On Location: Night of the Iguana |
| 1962-63 | Story Of... |
| 1961 | A Bowl of Cherries |

Producing Credits

| Year | Show |
|---|---|
| 1997-2000 | Undercover History |
| 1999 | The Man Who Makes Things Happen: David L. Wolper |
| 1995-98 | Mysteries of the Bible |
| 1988 | The World's Greatest Stunts: A Tribute to Hollywood Stuntmen |
| 1987 | Biography |
| 1987 | Playboy: Bedtime Stories |
| 1987 | The Ultimate Stuntman: A Tribute to Dar Robinson |
| 1981 | Small World |
| 1978-79 | In Search of... |
| 1977 | Mysteries of the Great Pyramid |
| 1970-72 | Plimpton! Specials |
| 1967 | National Geographic Special: Alaska! |
| 1965 | Time-Life Special: The Class of '49 |
| 1965 | Race for the Moon |
| 1964 | Krebiozen and Cancer: Thirteen Years of Bitter Conflict |
| 1964 | Hollywood and the Stars: On Location: Night of the Iguana |
| 1962-63 | Story Of... |

=== Novels ===
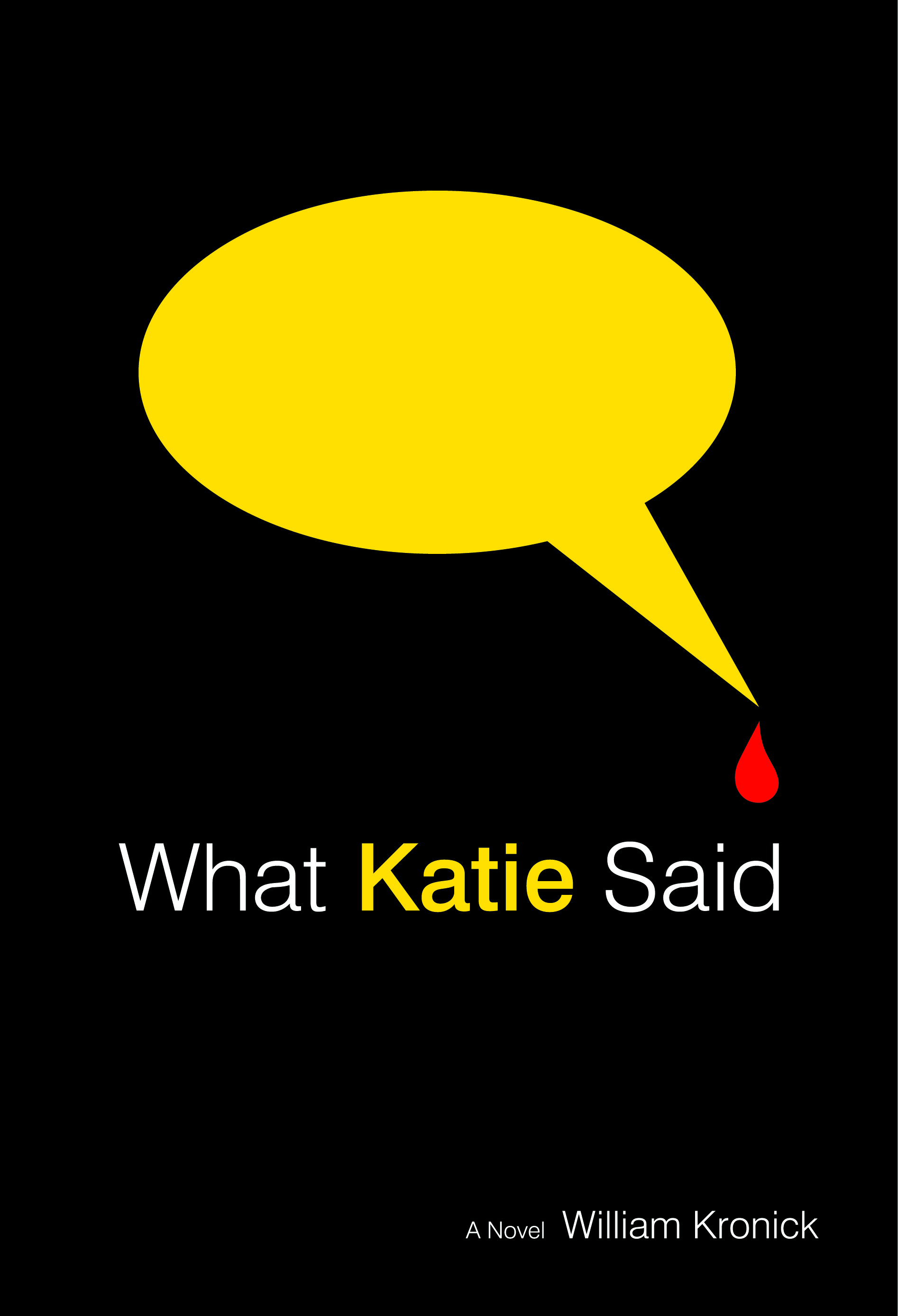
What Katie Said Kronick's latest novel Art by Cathie Sacho

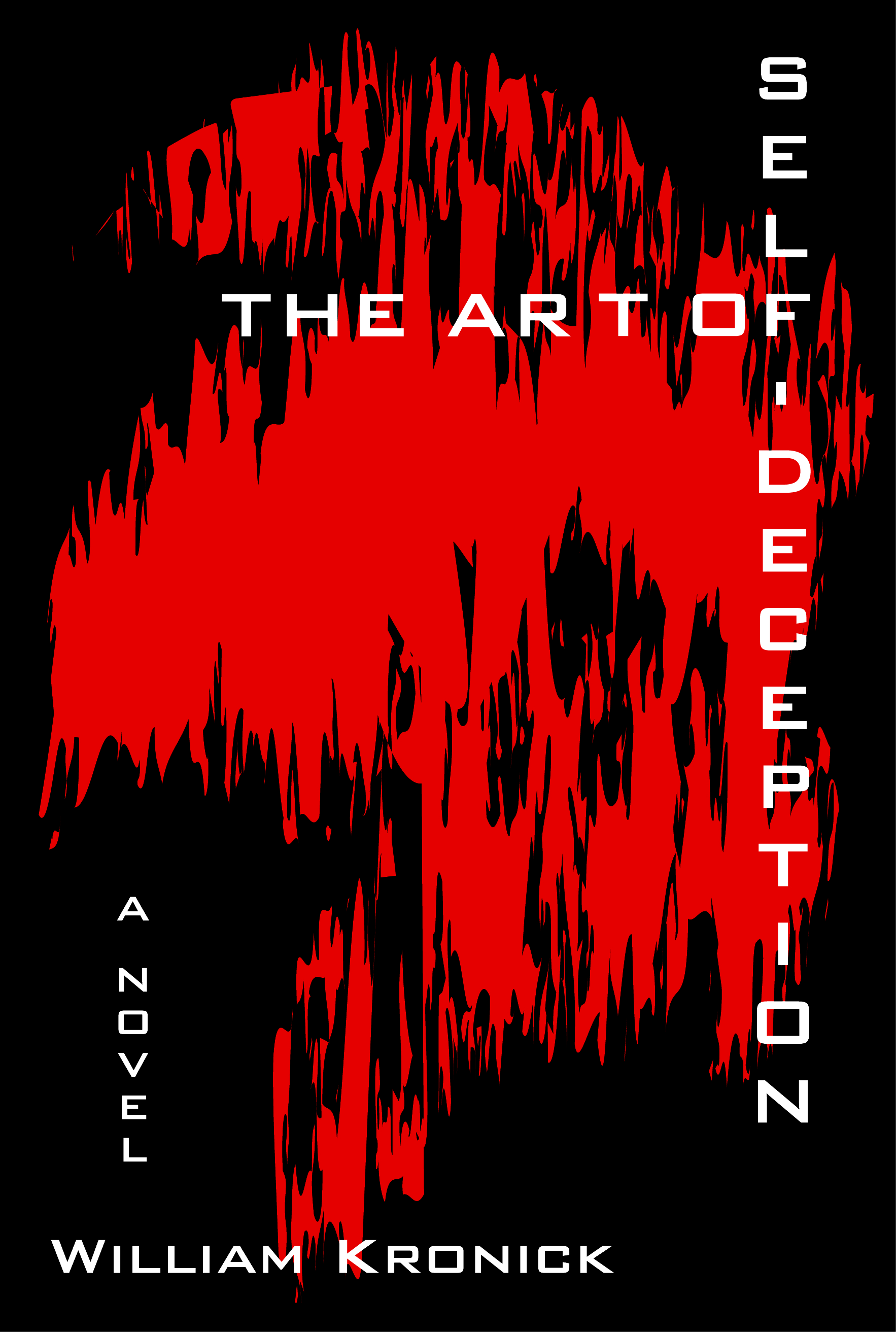
The Art of Self-Deception Art by Cathie Sacho

| Year | Title |
|---|---|
| 2015 | What Katie Said |
| 2011 | The Art of Self-Deception |
| 2008 | All Stars Die |
| 2006 | N.Y./L.A. |
| 2005 | Cooley Wyatt |
| 2004 | The Cry of Sirens |
