= The Coldest Journey =

2013 expedition to Antarctica

The Coldest Journey was a 2013 Commonwealth-supported expedition to Antarctica with the aim of becoming the first team ever to cross the Antarctic land mass during the polar winter. The endeavour aimed to raise more than $10 million for Seeing is Believing, a global charitable initiative which aims to eradicate avoidable blindness in developing countries. The team used cloud-based web technologies to connect with schools across the world as part of an educational programme designed to inspire a new generation towards high achievement. The project also performed scientific research and collected climate and weather data from Antarctica during the expedition to further the understanding of the effects of climate change on the polar regions.

== Team ==
The expedition had three main components: the Ice Team, led by Brian Newham after Expedition Co-Leader Sir Ranulph Fiennes had to pull out due to injury, the Marine Team led by Anton Bowring (Expedition Co-Leader), and the Operations Team led by Tristam Kaye (Global Operations and Programme Manager).

The Ice Team was made up of Brian Newham (leader (formerly traverse manager)), Robert Lambert (expedition doctor), Ian Prickett, Spencer Smirl (lead mechanic/driver), and Richmond Dykes (mechanic/driver).

On 25 February 2013, Fiennes abandoned the expedition and was evacuated to Princess Elisabeth Station, due to frostbite suffered while attempting to fix a ski binding without gloves at −30 °C (−22 °F). The rest of the team set off from Crown Bay on 21 March 2013 under the leadership of Brian Newham. They had until the September equinox to complete the 4,000 kilometres (2,500 mi) traverse successfully in winter. Most of the expedition was carried out in complete darkness and in temperatures as cold as −80 °C (−112 °F) or lower.

== Journey ==
The team detected many crevasses on its way to south pole. The progress was very slow and the team covered only 300 kilometres (190 mi) (of a planned 4,000 kilometres (2,500 mi)). It found a crevasse field extending up to 100 km and the team concluded that it was too dangerous to attempt to cross these crevasses with heavy equipment. On 18 June 2013 the team officially halted its expedition to cross Antarctica and decided to focus the remainder of the time on scientific experiments.
