= The New Elizabethans =

The New Elizabethans was a 2012 series on BBC Radio 4 to mark the diamond Jubilee of Queen Elizabeth II. A panel of seven academics, journalists and historians, chaired by Chief Executive of the Royal Opera House Tony Hall took suggestions from the general public for people "whose actions during the reign of Elizabeth II have had a significant impact on lives in these islands and given the age its character, for better or worse".

A short piece was written about each of the 60 people selected. These were presented by James Naughtie. The first broadcast was about Edmund Hillary and was first aired at 12:45 p.m. on Monday, 11 June and the series concluded with Queen Elizabeth II on Friday, 7 September 2012.

== The list ==
1. Edmund Hillary
2. Elizabeth David
3. Graham Greene
4. Michael Young
5. Vladimir Raitz
6. Francis Crick
7. Doris Lessing
8. Alan Sainsbury
9. Alfred Hitchcock
10. Laurence Olivier
11. Benjamin Britten
12. Dorothy Hodgkin
13. Harold Pinter
14. Richard Doll
15. Tony Hancock
16. Philip Larkin
17. Barbara Windsor
18. Lord Denning
19. Paul Foot
20. Francis Bacon
21. John Lennon and Paul McCartney
22. Margot Fonteyn
23. Peter Hall
24. Terence Conran
25. Enoch Powell
26. Cicely Saunders
27. Basil D'Oliveira
28. George Best
29. Germaine Greer
30. Robert Edwards
31. Jack Jones
32. Roald Dahl
33. David Bowie
34. Talaiasi Labalaba, Fijian-born NCO and member of SAS
35. Jocelyn Bell Burnell
36. Roy Jenkins
37. Vivienne Westwood
38. Jayaben Desai
39. Stuart Hall
40. David Attenborough
41. Margaret Thatcher
42. David Hockney
43. Billy Connolly
44. Ralph Robins
45. Amartya Sen
46. Salman Rushdie
47. Anita Roddick
48. Norman Foster
49. Charles Saatchi
50. Goldie
51. John Hume and David Trimble
52. Doreen Lawrence
53. Tim Berners-Lee
54. Diana, Princess of Wales
55. Alex Salmond
56. Tony Blair
57. Fred Goodwin
58. Rupert Murdoch
59. Simon Cowell
60. Queen Elizabeth II
