= Mike Kealy =

British Army officer

- Born: 29 May 1945
- Died: 1 February 1979 (aged 33); Brecon Beacons, Wales
- Military career
- Allegiance: United Kingdom
- Branch: British Army
- Service years: 1963–1979
- Rank: Major
- Unit: Special Air Service
- Conflicts: Dhofar Rebellion: Battle of Mirbat
- Awards: Distinguished Service Order

Major Michael John Anthony Kealy, DSO (29 May 1945 – 1 February 1979) was a British Army officer who served in the Special Air Service and was awarded the Distinguished Service Order for his role in the Battle of Mirbat in 1972. Kealy was the commander of a nine-member SAS squad, which came under attack from hundreds of Popular Front for the Liberation of the Occupied Arabian Gulf guerillas during the Dhofar Rebellion in Oman.

== Death ==
Kealy died of hypothermia on 1 February 1979 when he joined SAS candidates on a selection march in the Brecon Beacons in deteriorating weather conditions. He was found alive (but in poor condition) by his fellow soldier John Watts, who stayed with him and attempted to keep him warm. It was later acknowledged by the coroner that one of the major contributory factors in his death was the delay in retrieving him from the hillside—a delay of some 19 hours due to inclement weather. Another factor was that Kealy had not packed cold weather gear, instead carrying bricks in his Bergen pack to increase its weight to 50 pounds. When offered warm clothing by the search party, he refused—and even threw a warm blanket away. A combination of Kealy's stubbornness and the effects of hypothermia clouding his judgement seems to have been the tipping point.

As a direct result of this and similar incidents, those attempting SAS selection are now allowed to carry only useful items in their bergens when marching.

== In fiction ==
Ranulph Fiennes turns the real Mike Kealy into a fictional character in his book The Feather Men. In the novel, Mike Kealy is murdered by a group of contract killers called "The Clinic" in revenge for his role in Oman that had resulted in the killing of a sheik's son. Rather than succumbing to the extreme weather conditions while on an endurance march, as actually happened, the fictional character dies after going into diabetic shock following him being injected with insulin by "The Clinic".
