= Transglobe Expedition =

Expedition from south to north poles using only surface transport

- Sponsor: Self-funded and sponsored
- Country: Earth
- Leader: Ranulph Fiennes
- Start: Greenwich, United Kingdom; 2 September 1979
- End: Greenwich, United Kingdom; 29 August 1982
- Goal: Surface circumnavigation from south to north poles
- Crew: Ranulph Fiennes, Oliver Shepard, Charles R. Burton
- Achievements: First surface circumnavigation via both geographical poles

The Transglobe Expedition (1979–1982) was the first expedition to make a longitudinal (north–south) circumnavigation of the Earth using only surface transport. British adventurer Sir Ranulph Fiennes led a team, including Oliver Shepard and Charles R. Burton, that attempted to follow the Greenwich meridian over both land and water. They began in Greenwich in the United Kingdom in September 1979 and travelled south, arriving at the South Pole on 15 December 1980. Over the next 14 months, they travelled north, reaching the North Pole on 11 April 1982. Travelling south once more, they arrived again in Greenwich on 29 August 1982. It required traversing both of the poles and the use of boats in some places. Oliver Shepard took part in the Antarctic leg of the expedition. Ginny Fiennes handled all communications between the land team and their support, and ran the polar bases.

== Planning ==
The original idea for the expedition was conceived by Ginny Fiennes in February 1972. The trip was entirely funded through sponsorships and the free labour of the expedition members, which took seven years to organize.

Before the expedition, they had to limit the food that they ate. They brought a large amount of bread, cereal, and coffee. During their crossing of the Sahara, they brought no butter because of high temperatures. They also had to use repellent cream in order to keep insects away as well as anti-malarial tablets.

== Expedition ==
=== South Pole ===
Ranulph Fiennes, Charles Burton, and Oliver Shepard left London on 2 September 1979, beginning with a relatively simple overland trip through France and Spain, then across West Africa through the Sahara. They boarded the ship the Benjamin Bowring in the Gulf of Guinea and travelled by sea to South Africa. After preparations in South Africa, they sailed for Antarctica on 22 December 1979, and arrived on 4 January 1980.

With help from Ginny Fiennes and Giles Kershaw, they built a base camp near the SANAE III base. They named the base camp Ryvingen, after the nearby Ryvingen Peak. Burton, Shepard, Ranulph Fiennes, and Ginny Fiennes (and their dog Bothie) remained at this base all winter, in four cardboard huts which quickly became buried in the snow.

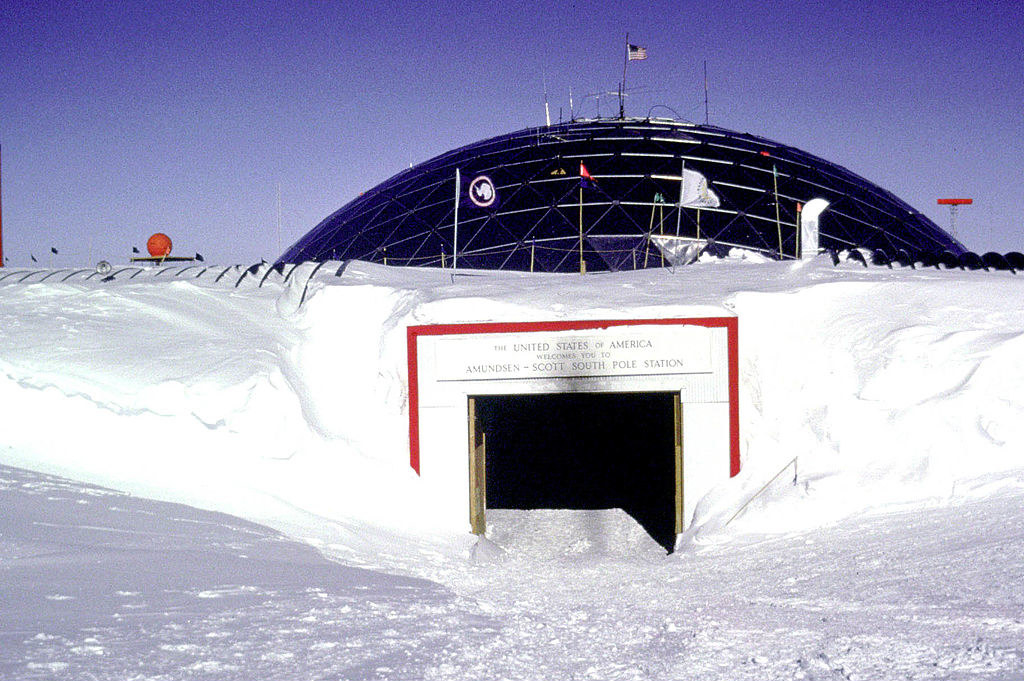
The Amundsen–Scott South Pole Station, which the expedition reached on 15 December 1980.

On 29 August 1980, Ranulph Fiennes left with Burton and Shephard for the South Pole. They travelled by snowmobiles, pulling sledges with supplies, while Kershaw flew ahead to leave fuel depots for them. As they travelled, they took 2-meter snow samples, one of many scientific undertakings that convinced sponsors to support the trip. They reached the South Pole on 15 December 1980. They remained in a small camp next to the South Pole station dome, where they played the first game of cricket at the South Pole, and departed on 23 December 1980. They descended the Scott Glacier (the third party to do so), crossed the Ross Ice Shelf, and arrived at Scott Base on 11 January 1981, completing their Antarctic crossing.

=== North Pole ===
As part of the expedition, Fiennes and Burton completed the Northwest Passage. They left Tuktoyaktuk on 26 July 1981, in a 18 ft open Boston Whaler motorboat and reached Tanquary Fiord, 36 days later, on 31 August 1981. Their journey was the first open boat transit of the Northwest Passage from West to East, and covered around 3,000 miles (2,600 nautical miles; 4,800 kilometres), taking a route through Dolphin and Union Strait following the South coast of Victoria and King William Islands, North, via Franklin Strait and Peel Sound, to Resolute Bay (on the southern side of Cornwallis Island), around the South and East coasts of Devon Island, through Hell Gate (near Cardigan Strait) and across Norwegian Bay to Eureka, Greely Bay and the head of Tanquary Fiord.

Between Tuktoyaktuk and Tanquary Fiord, they traveled at an average speed of around 80 miles (70 nmi; 130 km) per day.

Once they reached Tanquary Fiord they had to trek 150 miles (130 nmi; 240 km) overland, via Lake Hazen, to Alert, Nunavut, before setting up their winter base camp.

== Impact ==
The journey was recorded in a book by Fiennes, To the Ends of the Earth: The Transglobe Expedition, The First Pole-to-Pole Circumnavigation of the Globe (1983). It was also the subject of a 1983 film, also titled To the Ends of the Earth, made by director William Kronick and featuring actor Richard Burton as the narrator. The trip was also recorded in the 1997 Guinness Book of World Records.

Following the completion of the voyage Ranulph and Ginny Fiennes released a book about the adventures of their dog Bothie, a Jack Russell terrier, who became the only dog to ever visit both the North and South poles. Called Bothie the Polar Dog, the book was published in 1984 and was reported to be a best-seller.

=== Transglobe Expedition Trust ===
Following the expedition, in 1993 a charitable trust was established to support other expeditions with humanitarian, scientific or educational goals. The trust is a registered UK charity and has supported a number of projects including Ed Stafford's 2010 expedition to walk the length of the Amazon River, and survey of the endangered Bactrian camel.

== See also ==
- Explorer – 2022 documentary film on the explorer Ranulph Fiennes
