= Explorer (film) =

2022 documentary film by Matthew Dyas

- Directed by: Matthew Dyas
- Starring: Ranulph Fiennes; Anton Bowring
- Cinematography: Chris Openshaw
- Edited by: Ben Stark; Charlie Hawryliw
- Music by: Rebekka Karijord
- Production companies: BFI; Good Productions; Universal Pictures Content Group
- Distributed by: Universal Pictures Content Group
- Release date: 14 July 2022
- Running time: 113 minutes
- Country: United Kingdom
- Language: English

Explorer is a 2022 biographical documentary film about the life and exploits of British explorer Sir Ranulph Fiennes, directed by Matthew Dyas. It was critically acclaimed as a "compelling portrait" of Fiennes.

== Synopsis ==
The film includes both contemporary and archive footage and covers many aspects of Fiennes' life including self-amputation of his fingers due to frostbite, involvement in the Dhofar Rebellion, leading the Transglobe Expedition, being booted out of the SAS, running 7 marathons on 7 days on 7 continents, auditioning for James Bond, and reflections on his personal and family life.

== Cast ==
- Ranulph Fiennes as himself
- Anton Bowring as himself
- HM King Charles III as himself

== Release ==
=== Box office ===
Explorer was released to theatres on 14 July 2022. It was released to video on 30 August 2022.

=== Critical reception ===
On Rotten Tomatoes the film has a 100% rating based on reviews from 16 critics. On Metacritic it has score of 81 out of 100 based on reviews from 5 critics "universal acclaim". It has a 3 star review by Cath Clarke for the Guardian and a 5 star review by Robbie Collin for the Telegraph. Wendy Ide of The Observer gave the film a rating of 4 stars out of 5, which was higher than the rating awarded by the sister paper the Guardian. She called the film a "compelling portrait" of the subject.

Empire contributor Ian Freer gave a 4 star rating, writing "If it adds little in the way of dissenting voices or a different viewpoint, Explorer tells the tale of a remarkable, stranger-than-fiction life and emerges as an affecting, entertaining portrait of a true eccentric". Nell Minow for RogerEbert.com gave the film a 3.5 (out of 4) star rating writing that the "organization of the film is distracting" however the subject is "never less than enthralling". Kevin Maher of The Times gave it 4 out 5.
