= Charles R. Burton =

English explorer

Charles Robert Burton
- Born: 13 December 1942; Cape Town, South Africa
- Died: 15 July 2002 (aged 59); Framfield
- Education: Millfield
- Occupations: British Army soldier, explorer
- Spouse: Thelma Petts (m. 1981–2002)
- Military career
- Allegiance: United Kingdom
- Branch: British Army
- Service years: 1961–1967
- Units: Royal Sussex Regiment, Special Air Service

Charles Robert Burton (13 December 1942 – 15 July 2002) known as Charlie Burton was an English explorer, best known for his part in the Transglobe Expedition, the first expedition to circumnavigate the globe from pole to pole. Serving as cook, radio operator, and mechanic, he was the only member of the team to accompany the expedition's leader, Ranulph Fiennes, on the entire route.

Burton was born in Cape Town, South Africa. He attended Millfield school in Somerset, where he excelled more in sports than academics. From 1961 to 1967, he was a soldier in the British Army, serving with the elite Special Air Service and traveling to the Middle East, Northern Ireland, Malta, and Germany. After his military career, Burton held odd jobs, mainly with various private security firms.

While bartending at The Admiral Codrington pub in Chelsea in 1975, he met Fiennes, with whom he spent some four years organizing and raising money for the Transglobe Expedition. After the expedition, which lasted from 1979 to 1982, Burton returned to the security business. Ten years later, he helped Fiennes organize another expedition, but declined to participate.

Burton married Thelma "Twink" Petts in April 1981 in Sydney, Australia, while on the Transglobe Expedition. He died of a heart attack on 15 July 2002 at his family home in the village of Framfield in Sussex.

== See also ==
- Oliver Shepard
- Ginny Fiennes
