= Mike Stroud (physician) =

British gastroenterologist

- Born: Michael Adrian Stroud; 17 April 1955 (age 71); England
- Education: University College London and St George's Hospital Medical School
- Occupation: Physician
- Known for: Polar expeditions with Ranulph Fiennes; TV appearances as endurance expert
- Spouse: Thea (née de Moel) m. 1987
- Children: 2
- Website: http://drmikestroud.com/

Michael Adrian Stroud, OBE, FRCP (born 17 April 1955) is a professor of medicine and nutrition at Southampton University Hospitals NHS Trust, England. He has interests in gastroenterology and human health under extreme conditions. After semi-retirement in 2016, he works part time.

Stroud became widely known when he partnered with Ranulph Fiennes on polar expeditions and other endurance events.

== Early life ==
Stroud was educated at Trinity School of John Whitgift in the London Borough of Croydon. He obtained a degree (intercalated BSc) from University College London in anthropology and genetics in 1976, before qualifying as a medical doctor from St George's Hospital Medical School, London in 1979.

== Medical career ==
After qualifying, and working junior hospital jobs, Stroud worked for the Ministry of Defence as an expert on human performance at environmental extremes. He then returned to his medical career to train as a Gastroenterologist with a specialist interest in clinical nutrition. He became a Member of the Royal College of Physicians in 1984 and a Fellow in 1995. His interest in human endurance under extreme conditions was based on personal experience including running multi-marathons in the Sahara and trekking across polar ice. He has worked for the Ministry of Defence researching the nutritional needs of soldiers in action and the effects of heat and cold on human performance.

In 1998, Stroud became a Senior Lecturer in Nutrition and Medicine and a Consultant Gastroenterologist at the Southampton University Hospitals NHS Trust. He went on to undertake extensive work on the provision of optimal nutrition and fluids to sick patients, chairing the NICE expert groups that developed the UK national guidance on both Nutrition Support in Adults and the use of Intravenous Fluids in Adults. After semi-retirement in 2016, he works part time. In 2017, he was given a personal professorial chair in Clinical Nutrition.

== Expeditions and endurance ==
Stroud was the doctor on the In the footsteps of Scott Antarctic expedition in 1984–1986. He then joined Ranulph Fiennes in a series of expeditions between 1986 and 1990, attempting to journey on foot to the North Pole unsupported by other men, animals or machines. In 1992/3 Stroud and Fiennes made the first unsupported crossing of the Antarctic continent, although they were unable to cross the Ross Ice Shelf to reach the open sea. Drinking isotope labelled water and collecting regular blood and urine samples, Stroud discovered that their energy expenditure averaged nearly 7,000 calories per day, with one ten day period that averaged over 11,000 calories per day. These were and remain the highest daily energy expenditures ever formally measured in man.

Stroud, together with Fiennes, is a supporter of rigorous exercise to help slow down the aging process. He points out that historically the human body is pre-tuned to undergo bouts of hard work and in particular can cope remarkably well with endurance events in hot climates. He argues that our current sedentary lifestyle conflicts with our body's design and is leading to the health issues that an increasing proportion of the Western world is experiencing today.

In 2003 Stroud and Fiennes both completed seven marathons on seven continents in seven days in the Land Rover 7x7x7 Challenge for the British Heart Foundation.. This exploit added further to the moneys raised for charity by Fiennes and Stroud during their previous polar expeditions together with the total of sums raised amounting to several million pounds for a variety of causes particularly the Multiple Sclerosis Society and the British Heart Foundation.

On Tuesday 22 July 2014 Stroud joined four others (Chris Buckton, Barry Robson, Mark Harding and Ian Smith) in kayaking 77.3 miles across the English Channel on sit-on-top kayaks helping to raise money and awareness for Macmillan Cancer Support and Heroes on the Water UK. This took 19 hours 21 minutes during which he never left the kayak. It is believed that this is the first time this has been done before in this direction as paddling South is notoriously difficult.

in 2022, Stroud and Chris Buckton competed using a twin kayak in the Yukon 1000 mile race - the World's longest canoeing event from Canada to Alaska. Their successful completion made Stroud one of the oldest competitors ever to finish the event.

== Other work ==
Stroud was the on-screen expert on endurance performance for all 3 of the BBC TV series SAS: Are You Tough Enough? and then presented his own BBC series The Challenge. He also featured as the main participant in one of the BBC programmes Through the Keyhole hosted by Sir David Frost.

== Personal life ==
Stroud married Thea de Moel in 1987; Thea died in September 2018. They have a son and a daughter.

== Honours ==
Stroud was appointed Officer of the Order of the British Empire in the 1993 Queen's Birthday Honours "for Human Endeavour and for charitable services". On 20 December 1994, he was awarded the Polar Medal "for outstanding achievement and service to British Polar exploration and research".

In 1995, he was elected a Fellow of the Royal College of Physicians.

== Bibliography ==
- Mike Stroud (1993). Shadows on the Wasteland. Jonathan Cape. ISBN 0-224-03846-X.
- Mike Stroud (1998). Survival of the Fittest. Jonathan Cape. ISBN 0-224-04485-0.
