= Killer Elite (film) =

2011 action film by Gary McKendry

- Theatrical release poster
- Directed by: Gary McKendry
- Screenplay by: Matt Sherring
- Based on: The Feather Men by Sir Ranulph Fiennes
- Produced by: Michael Boughen; Steve Chasman; Sigurjón Sighvatsson; Tony Winley
- Starring: Jason Statham; Clive Owen; Robert De Niro; Dominic Purcell; Aden Young; Yvonne Strahovski; Ben Mendelsohn
- Cinematography: Simon Duggan
- Edited by: John Gilbert
- Music by: Reinhold Heil; Johnny Klimek
- Production companies: Omnilab Media; Ambience Entertainment; Film Victoria; Wales Creative IP Fund
- Distributed by: Entertainment Film Distributors (United Kingdom); Walt Disney Studios Motion Pictures (Australia); Open Road Films (United States)
- Release dates: 10 September 2011 (TIFF); 23 September 2011 (United States); 23 February 2012 (Australia)
- Running time: 116 minutes
- Countries: Australia; United Kingdom; United States
- Language: English
- Budget: $70 million
- Box office: $56.4 million

Killer Elite is a 2011 action thriller film directed by Gary McKendry and starring Jason Statham, Clive Owen and Robert De Niro. The film is based on the 1991 novel The Feather Men by Ranulph Fiennes. The film marked the debut of Open Road Films. It was released in the United States on 23 September 2011 and received mixed reviews from critics.

== Plot ==
In 1980, Danny Bryce, Hunter, Davies and Meier are a group of mercenaries who arrive in Mexico to assassinate someone. Danny is shot when he becomes distracted after realising that he has killed the man in front of the target's young child. Affected by this, Danny retires from the group and returns to Australia.

The following year, Danny is summoned to Oman to meet a handler known as "the Agent", and he learns that Hunter was unable to do a $6 million job and that Danny must complete Hunter's mission in exchange for Hunter's life. Amr, a Sheikh and deposed king of a small region of Oman, wants Danny to kill three former SAS troopers—Steven Harris, Warwick Cregg and Simon McCann—for killing his three eldest sons during the Dhofar Rebellion. Danny must videotape their confessions and make their deaths look like accidents before Amr dies from his illness. This will allow Amr's fourth son Bakhait to regain control of his father's desert region. Danny approaches Davies and Meier, enlisting them to help in exchange for $3 million each man, while Danny will not receive anything because he merely wants to free Hunter.

Danny and Meier find Harris in Oman and gain access to his house while pretending to be researchers making a documentary. After Harris confesses on videotape, they take him to the bathroom, intending to make it look like he slipped and hit his head. However, Harris's girlfriend knocks on the door. While Danny and Meier are distracted, Harris attempts to break free, causing Meier to shoot him fatally. In England, Davies travels to a pub known to be frequented by British military personnel and questions bar patrons about former SAS members in Oman. This is reported to the Feather Men, a secret society of former operatives protecting their own. Their head enforcer, Spike Logan, is sent to investigate.

Davies discovers Cregg preparing for a long nighttime march in wintry weather on the Brecon Beacons mountain range. Danny infiltrates the base, disguised in uniform, and drugs Cregg's coffee. Danny follows Cregg and makes him confess before the drug puts him into shock to die of hypothermia.

Aware that the Feather Men are now following them, Danny decides to use a different tactic to kill their last target, McCann, who is now working as a mercenary. Their plan is to set up a fake job interview to lure McCann from his house and to crash a remote-controlled truck into McCann's car. With the help of the inexperienced Jake, Meier kills McCann. However, Logan and his men were watching McCann. A gunfight ensues, and Jake accidentally kills Meier.

Danny and Davies part ways. Davies is tracked down by Logan's men and is fatally hit by a truck while trying to escape. Danny returns to Oman and gives Amr the last confession, which he has faked. Hunter is released while Danny returns to Australia and reunites with Anne, a childhood acquaintance.

Danny is informed by the Agent that there is one last man who participated in the murder of Amr's sons, Ranulph Fiennes, who is about to release a book about his experiences in the SAS. Danny sends Anne to France so that Hunter can protect her. Bakhait confirms that Harris was innocent. Logan traces Danny through the Agent and sends a team to protect the author, but Jake distracts them, allowing Danny to shoot Fiennes. Danny merely wounds Fiennes, but takes pictures that appear to show him dead. Logan captures Danny, taking him to an abandoned warehouse, but a government agent arrives and reveals that the British government is behind the death of Amr's three sons because of Amr's valuable oil reserves and that Bakhait was in on it the whole time.

A three-way battle ensues, with Danny escaping and Logan shooting the government agent. Danny and Hunter head to Oman to give Amr the pictures. However, Logan arrives and tells Amr that the pictures are fake and stabs him to death. Bakhait does not care because his father's death benefits him, similar to how he sacrificed his three brothers to the British in exchange for wealth. Bakhait gives $6 million to Logan, which was meant for Danny and Hunter. Hunter spots Logan leaving, where they chase him with Amr's men.

After stopping Amr's men, Danny and Hunter confront Logan on a desert road. Hunter takes some of the money for his expenses and his family. They leave the remaining money to Logan, telling him that he will need it to start a new life after killing the government agent and acting against the wishes of the Feather Men and the British government. Danny says that it is over for him and that Logan must make up his own mind about what to do. Danny reunites with Anne.

== Cast ==
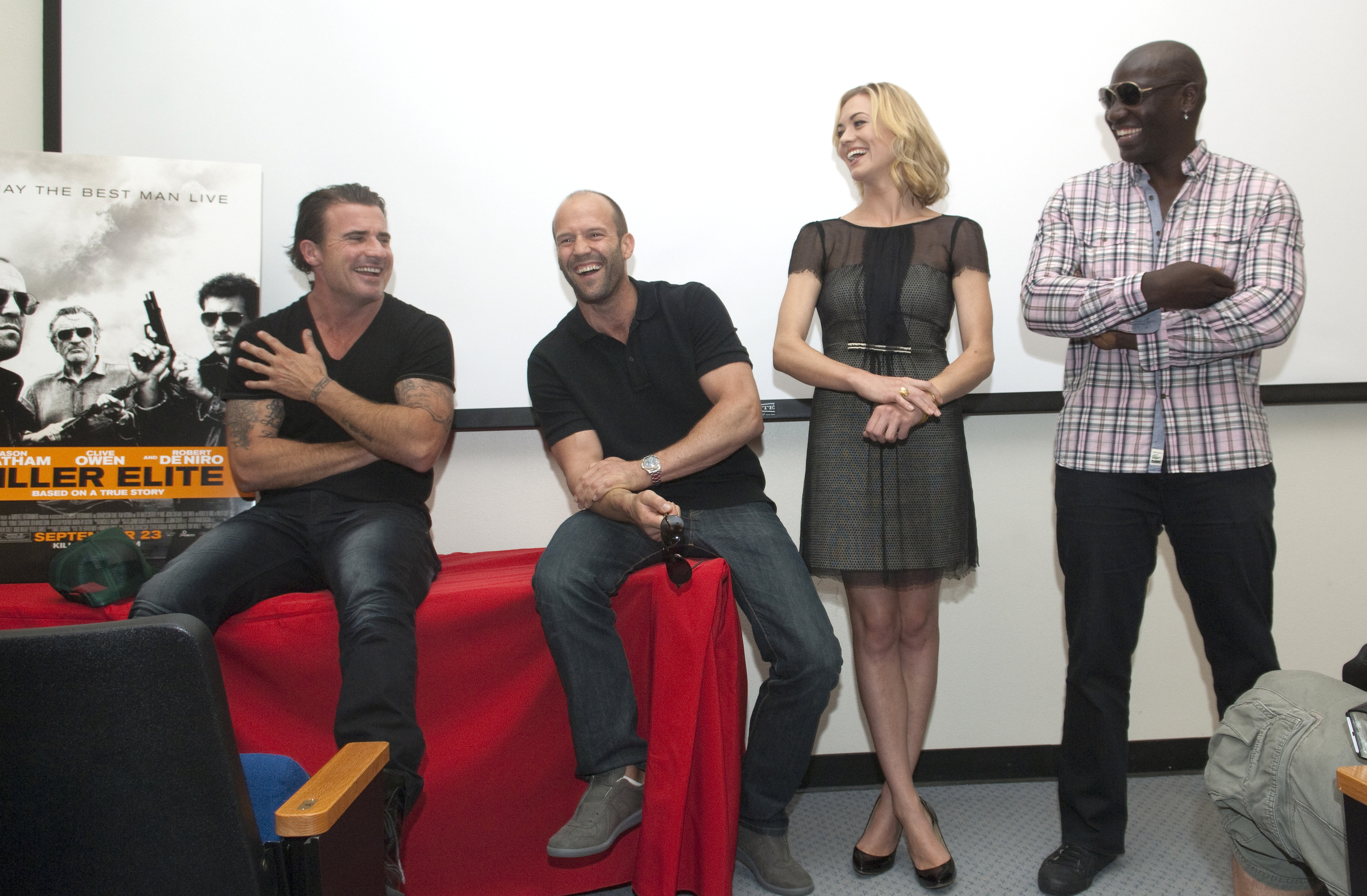
From left: Dominic Purcell, Jason Statham, Yvonne Strahovski and Adewale Akinnuoye-Agbaje.

- Jason Statham as Danny Bryce
- Clive Owen as Spike Logan
- Yvonne Strahovski as Anne Frazier
- Robert De Niro as Hunter
- Lachy Hulme as Steven Harris
- Dominic Purcell as Davies
- Aden Young as Meier
- Adewale Akinnuoye-Agbaje as The Agent
- Ben Mendelsohn as Martin
- Grant Bowler as Warwick Cregg
- Matt Nable as Pennock
- Michael Dorman as Jake
- Daniel Roberts as Simon McCann
- Firass Dirani as Bakhait
- Rodney Afif as Sheikh Amr
- Dion Mills as Sir Ranulph Fiennes
- Nick Tate as Commander B

== Production ==
The Internet Movie Database cites a number of locations used for filming. Filming began at Docklands Studios, with De Niro filming a scene in Melbourne's Spring Street set in 1970s Paris. The scene of McCann's death by tanker truck was filmed on Dynon Road, Melbourne. The final scene was filmed on Little Collins Street in Melbourne.

Some London scenes were filmed in Cardiff. In July 2010, De Niro and Statham were seen filming outside The Promised Land Bar on Windsor Place. Other scenes shot in Cardiff were also on Windsor Place, showing the City United Reformed Church, The Buffalo Bar and various small business buildings. The Agent's several meetings with other characters at a stone, columned monument were shot at the Welsh National War Memorial in Alexandra Gardens, Cardiff. A scene in which the Welshman leaves a building was shot on Kings Road, Pontcanna, showing Kings Road Doctors' Surgery and residential buildings. Another scene was shot at The Blue Anchor Inn in East Aberthaw, Vale of Glamorgan.

In July 2010, filming took place near the Storey Arms outdoor centre in the Brecon Beacons.

=== The Feather Men ===
The plot for the film is based on the novel The Feather Men by Ranulph Fiennes. Fiennes claims that a secret society called the "Feather Men", made up of retired and disabled SAS members, was operating in the shadows. They are called the "feather men" because their influence and intervention were subtle, like the touch of a feather. Their job was to protect SAS personnel and their families and avenge wrongs or harm done to them.

== Reception ==
The film had a gala-premiere at the 36th Toronto International Film Festival on 10 September 2011. On the review aggregator website Rotten Tomatoes, 27% of 124 critics' reviews are positive. The website's consensus reads: "A rote, utterly disposable Jason Statham vehicle that just happens to have Clive Owen and Robert De Niro in it." Metacritic, which uses a weighted average, assigned the film a score of 44 out of 100, based on 29 critics, indicating "mixed or average" reviews. Audiences polled by CinemaScore gave the film an average grade of "B" on a scale of A+ to F.

Roger Ebert of the Chicago Sun-Times gave it 3 stars out of 4, calling it director Gary McKendry's "impressive debut", noting that he "understands that action is better when it's structured around character and plot, and doesn't rely on simple sensation".
