= Mirbat =

Mirbat Mirbāţ
- Town
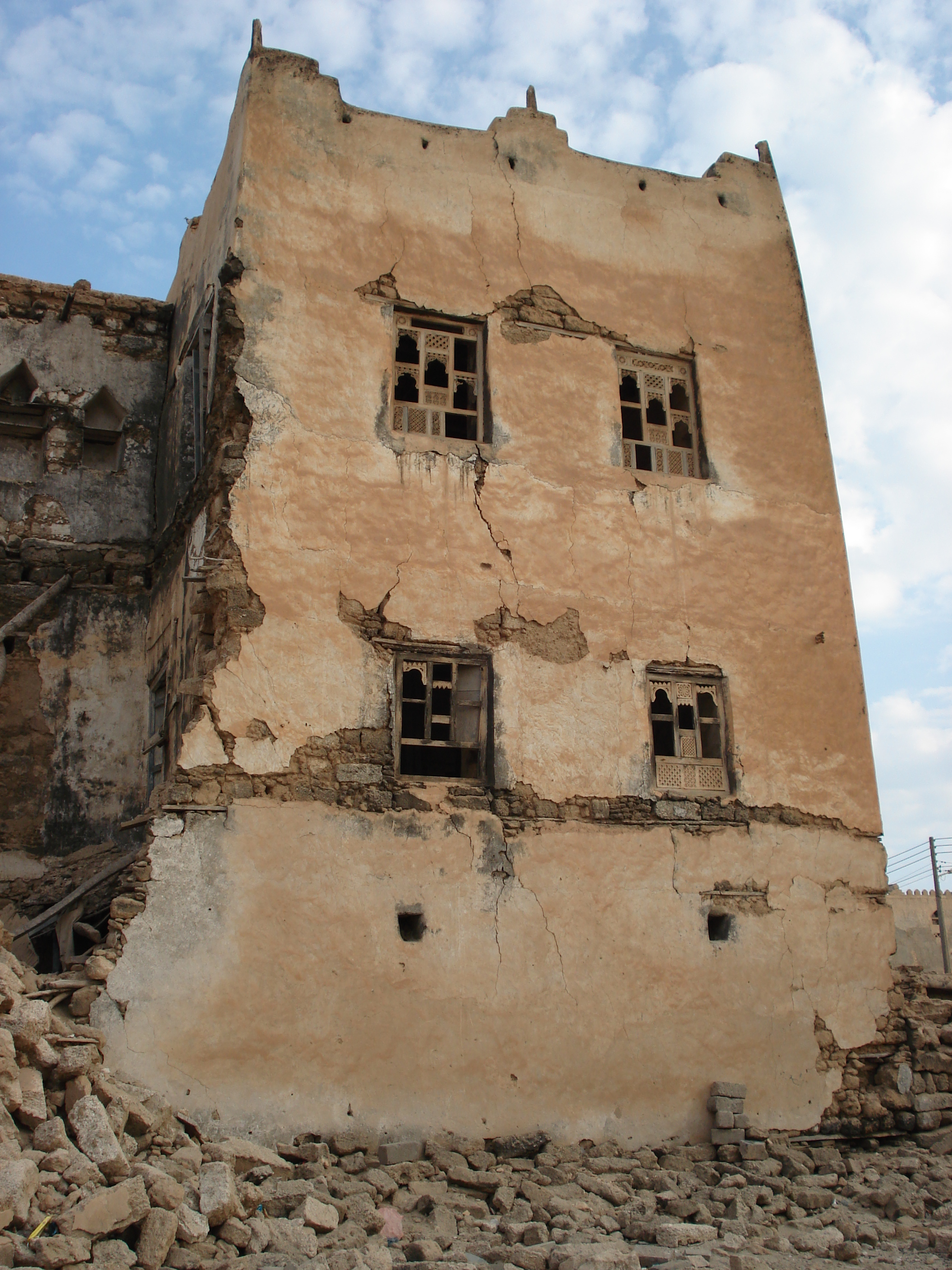
- One of Mirbat's several dilapidated Yemeni-style mud-brick structures

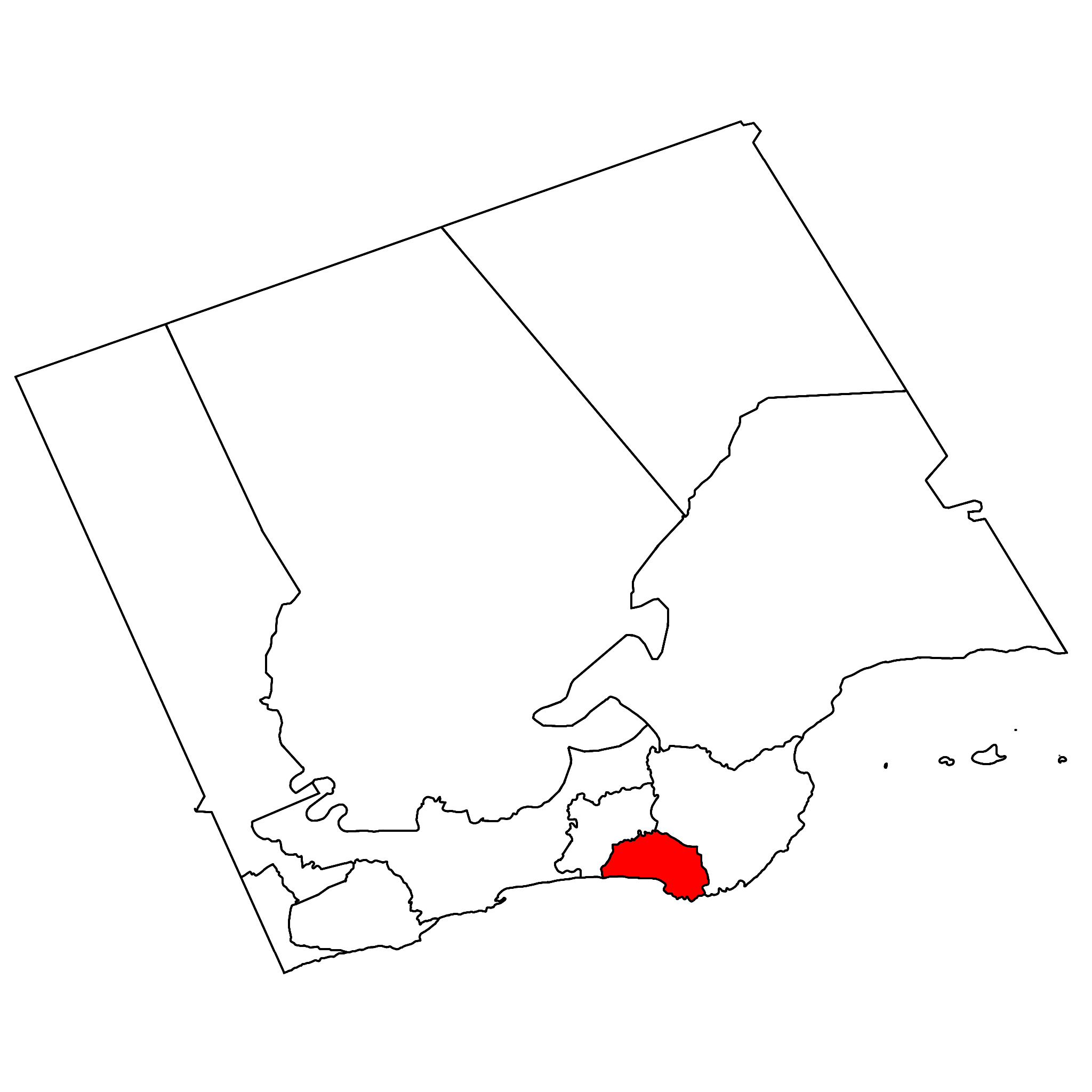
- The wilayat of Mirbat in the Dhofar Governorate

- Location in Oman
- Coordinates: 16°59′19″N 54°41′32″E
- Country: Oman
- Governorate: Dhofar Governorate

Population (2020-12-12)
  - Total: 9,886
- (16,364 including the entire wilayat)
- Time zone: UTC+4 (GST)

Mirbat (Arabic: مرباط, romanized: Mirbāṭ) is a coastal town in the Dhofar governorate, in southwestern Oman. In 2020, the town had a population of 9,886, while the wilayat as a whole had a population of 16,364. It was the site of the 1972 Battle of Mirbat between Communist guerrillas and the armed forces of the Sultan of Oman and their British Special Air Service advisers.

Mirbat (Moscha) was involved in the export of frankincense in ancient times, to places as far away as China.

Mirbat also houses the mausoleum of Bin Ali.

== See also ==
- Battle of Mirbat
