= The Feather Men =

1991 novel by Ranulph Fiennes

- First edition
- Author: Sir Ranulph Fiennes
- Language: English
- Genre: Fiction novel
- Publisher: Bloomsbury Publishing
- Publication date: 17 October 1991
- Publication place: United Kingdom
- Media type: Print
- Pages: 256 pages
- ISBN: 0-7475-1049-0

The Feather Men is a 1991 novel by the British adventurer Sir Ranulph Fiennes. The book was initially published on 17 October 1991 by Bloomsbury Publishing. In 2011 it was loosely adapted into the film Killer Elite.

== Plot introduction ==
The book tells the story of four British Army soldiers, including two members of the Special Air Service, who are assassinated by a hit squad known as "The Clinic". The murders are carried out over a 17-year period, on the orders of a Dubai sheikh whose three sons were killed by British forces in Oman during a battle with Communist guerrillas.

Fiennes claimed that he himself was targeted by the group, but was saved by a group of vigilantes calling themselves the "Feather Men".

== Controversy ==
The novel caused considerable controversy over the claim that it was based on real events. Publisher Bloomsbury described it as a "true adventure" when it was published in 1991. Fiennes claimed that the Feather Men had shown him detailed dossiers on the assassins and their victims, and requested that he write an "authorised" history of the group. A source in the Ministry of Defence told The Daily Telegraph:

Many events Fiennes describes simply never took place. Frankly, it's just another example of the Special Forces' reputation being exploited for commercial gain.

Fiennes himself remained vague on the story's veracity, asserting that it was up to the reader to decide whether it was fact or fiction, and suggested journalists subject events and people described in the book to "forensic examination", and to draw their own conclusions. Fiennes describes his novels as "factional", meaning a blend of fact and fiction. The hardcover editions had the words "Fact or fiction?" printed on the covers, and contained an index, maps and photographs as a non-fiction book would. The paperback editions, however, presented the book as purely fiction and omitted the index and illustrations.

There is a paperback edition of The Feather Men which includes photographs of the victims and other real life characters, a map (Oman in 1976) and other illustrations (e.g. a block diagram of the modification of the BMW car brake system to incorporate remote radio control) and an index. It was published by Signet in 1992.

In June 2010, Alice Clarke, the daughter of SAS soldier Major Mike Kealy whose death is depicted in The Feather Men at the hands of The Clinic, spoke out, saying that her father had died during an endurance exercise in the Brecon Beacons in 1979. Describing Fiennes' claims as "disgraceful", she stated that her mother had confronted the author at the Hay Festival, and he had admitted to her that the story was a work of fiction.

In 2011, Fiennes stated in an interview with The Daily Beast: "I had chose to change my mind from time-to-time in terms of answering people, and at the moment, I choose to say that the book, and therefore the film, are total fiction. In 20 years time, I might change my mind (again)." He reaffirmed that he had the signed permission of the soldiers' families, including Kealy's wife, to mention them in the book.
