= Ranulph Fiennes =

English explorer (born 1944)

Sir Ranulph Fiennes Bt OBE
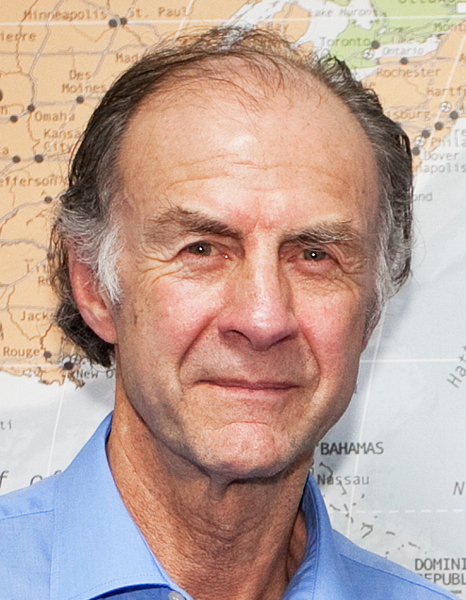
- Fiennes in 2014
- Born: Ranulph Twisleton-Wykeham-Fiennes; 7 March 1944 (age 82); Windsor, Berkshire, England
- Education: Mons Officer Cadet School
- Occupations: British Army Officer; explorer and travel writer
- Spouses: Ginny Pepper (m. 1970; died 2004) Louise Millington (m. 2005)
- Children: 1
- Awards: Order of the British Empire; Polar Medal (with double clasp)
- Military career
- Allegiance: United Kingdom
- Branch: British Army
- Service years: 1963–1983
- Rank: Captain
- Service number: 474357
- Units: Royal Scots Greys (1963–1966, 1966–1968); 22 SAS (1966); Royal Army of Oman (1967–1970); 22 SAS (R Sqn) (1970–1971); 21 SAS (Reserve) (1971–1983)

Sir Ranulph Twisleton-Wykeham-Fiennes, 3rd Baronet (born 7 March 1944) (Note: He has the triple-barrelled surname Twisleton-Wykeham-Fiennes, but is known by the surname Fiennes, as registered at birth) is an English explorer and writer who holds several endurance records.

Fiennes served in the British Army for eight years, including a period on counter-insurgency service while attached to the Army of the Sultanate of Oman. He later undertook numerous expeditions and was the first person to visit both the North Pole and South Pole by surface means and the first to completely cross Antarctica on foot. In May 2009, at the age of 65, he reached the summit of Mount Everest.

Guinness Book of Records founding editor Norris McWhirter in 1984 named Fiennes as the greatest living explorer. Fiennes has written numerous books about his army service and his expeditions as well as books on explorers Robert Falcon Scott and Ernest Shackleton.

== Early life and education ==
Ranulph Twisleton-Wykeham-Fiennes was born on 7 March 1944 in Windsor, Berkshire, nearly four months after the death of his father, Lieutenant-Colonel Sir Ranulph Twisleton-Wykeham-Fiennes. While commanding the Royal Scots Greys in Italy, Fiennes' father trod on a German anti-personnel S-mine and died of his wounds 11 days later in Naples on 24 November 1943. He was posthumously awarded the Distinguished Service Order. Fiennes' mother was Audrey Joan (died 2004), younger daughter of Sir Percy Newson. He inherited his father's baronetcy, becoming the 3rd Twisleton-Wykeham-Fiennes baronet at his birth.

After the war, his mother moved the family to South Africa, where he remained until he was 12. While in South Africa, he attended Western Province Preparatory School in Newlands, Cape Town. Fiennes then returned to be educated at Sandroyd School, Wiltshire, and later at Eton College.

== Career ==
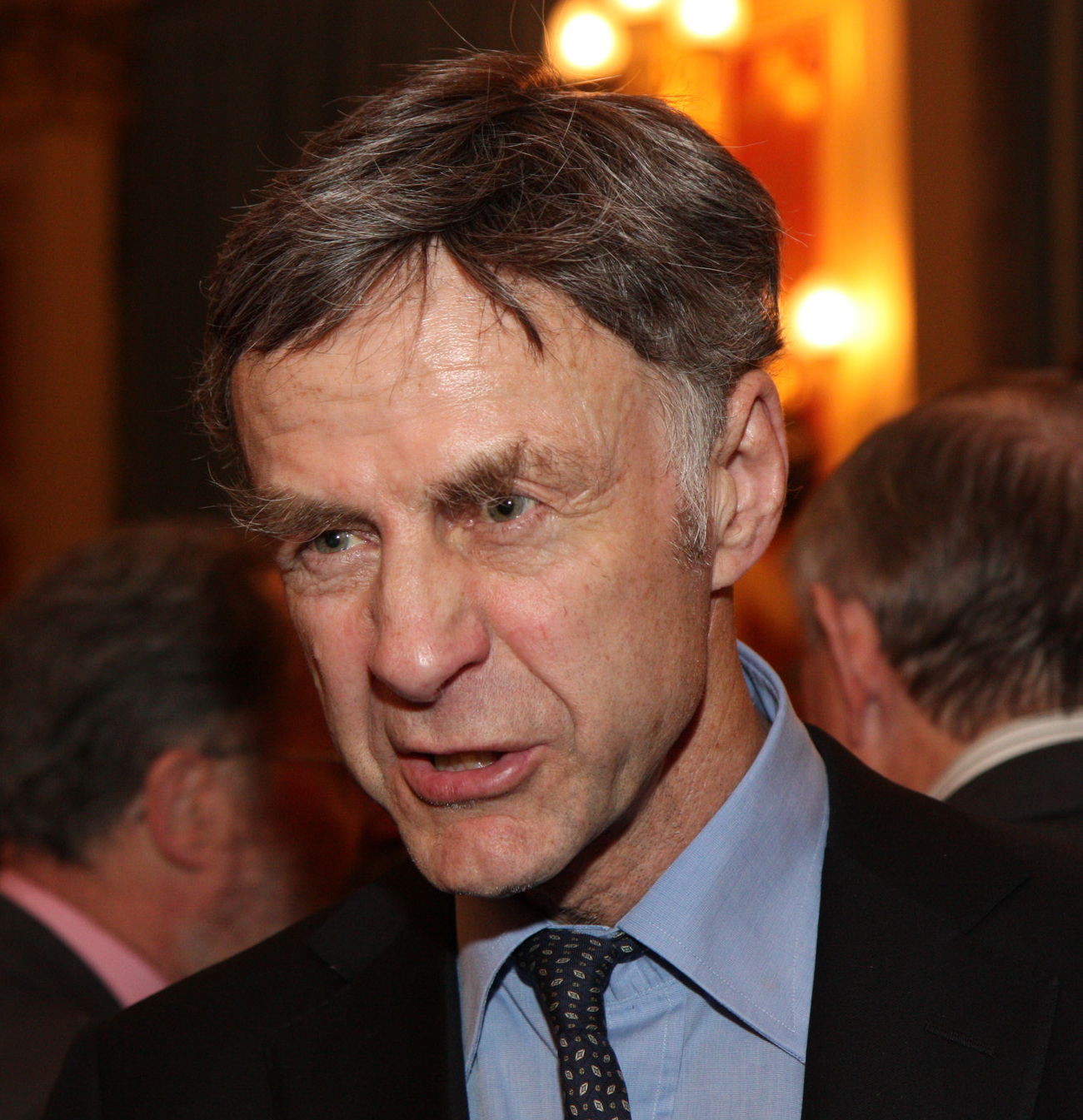
Fiennes at the Celebrating Captain Scott's Legacy event in London, 2012

=== Army officer ===
After failing to gain entry into the Royal Military Academy Sandhurst, Fiennes attended Mons Officer Cadet School. After completing several months' training, on 27 July 1963 he was granted a short service commission in his late father's former regiment, the Royal Scots Greys. He was later seconded to the Special Air Service where he specialised in demolitions.

Offended by the construction of a temporary sandbag dam built in Castle Combe, Wiltshire, by 20th Century Fox for the production of the 1967 film Doctor Dolittle, Fiennes with others plotted to blow up the dam but the police foiled the plan. Fiennes was fined £300 for conspiring to cause a public mischief, and £200 for unlawfully possessing explosives; he and a co-conspirator were dismissed from the SAS. He was initially posted to another cavalry regiment but was eventually permitted to return to the Royal Scots Greys.

Fiennes spent the last two years of his army career seconded to the Sultan of Oman's Armed Forces. At the time Oman was experiencing a growing communist insurgency supported from neighbouring South Yemen. After familiarisation, he commanded the Reconnaissance Platoon of the Muscat Regiment, seeing extensive active service in the Dhofar War. He led several raids deep into rebel-held territory on the Djebel Dhofar, and was decorated for bravery by the Sultanate.

After eight years' service Fiennes relinquished his commission on 27 July 1971.

=== Expedition leader ===
Since the 1960s Fiennes has been an expedition leader. He led expeditions up the White Nile on a hovercraft in 1969 and on Norway's Jostedalsbreen Glacier in 1970. A notable trek was the Transglobe Expedition he undertook between 1979 and 1982, when he and two fellow members of 21 SAS, Oliver Shepard and Charles R. Burton, journeyed around the world on its polar axis, using surface transport only. Nobody else has ever done so by any route before or since.

As part of the Transglobe Expedition, Fiennes and Burton completed the Northwest Passage. They left Tuktoyaktuk on 26 July 1981 in an 18 ft open Boston Whaler and reached Tanquary Fiord on 31 August 1981. Their journey was the first open boat transit from West to East and covered around 3,000 miles (2,600 nautical miles or 4,800 km), taking a route through Dolphin and Union Strait following the south coast of Victoria Island and King William Island, north to Resolute Bay via the Franklin Strait and Peel Sound, around the south and east coasts of Devon Island, through Hell Gate and across Norwegian Bay to Eureka, Greely Bay and the head of Tanquary Fiord. Once they reached Tanquary Fiord, they had to trek a further 150 miles via Lake Hazen to Alert before setting up their winter base camp.

In 1992 Fiennes led an expedition that discovered what may be an outpost of the lost city of Iram in Oman. The following year he joined nutrition specialist Mike Stroud to become the first to cross the Antarctic continent unsupported; they took 93 days. A further attempt in 1996 to walk to the South Pole solo, in aid of the Breast Cancer Campaign, was unsuccessful due to a kidney stone attack and he had to be rescued from the operation by his crew.

In 2000 he attempted to walk solo and unsupported to the North Pole. The expedition failed when his sleds fell through weak ice and Fiennes was forced to pull them out by hand. He sustained severe frostbite to the tips of all the fingers on his left hand, forcing him to abandon the attempt. On returning home, his surgeon insisted the necrotic fingertips be retained for several months before amputation, to allow regrowth of the remaining healthy tissue. Impatient at the pain the dying fingertips caused, Fiennes cut them off himself with an electric fretsaw, just above where the blood and the soreness was.

Despite suffering from a heart attack and undergoing a double coronary artery bypass operation just four months before, Fiennes joined Stroud again in 2003 to complete seven marathons in seven days on seven continents in the Land Rover 7x7x7 Challenge for the British Heart Foundation. "In retrospect I wouldn't have done it. I would not do it again. It was Mike Stroud's idea." Their series of marathons was as follows:

- 26 October – Race 1: Patagonia – South America
- 27 October – Race 2: Falkland Islands – "Antarctica"
- 28 October – Race 3: Sydney – Australia
- 29 October – Race 4: Singapore – Asia
- 30 October – Race 5: London – Europe
- 31 October – Race 6: Cairo – Africa
- 1 November – Race 7: New York City – North America

Originally Fiennes had planned to run the first marathon on King George Island, Antarctica. The second marathon would then have taken place in Santiago, Chile. However, bad weather and aeroplane engine trouble caused him to change his plans, running the South American segment in southern Patagonia first and then hopping to the Falklands as a substitute for the Antarctic leg.

Speaking after the event, Fiennes said the Singapore Marathon had been by far the most difficult because of high humidity and pollution. He also said his cardiac surgeon had approved the marathons, providing his heart-rate did not exceed 130 beats per minute. Fiennes later said that he forgot to pack his heart-rate monitor, and therefore did not know how fast his heart was beating.

In June 2005, Fiennes had to abandon an attempt to be the oldest Briton to climb Mount Everest when, in another climb for charity, he was forced to turn back as a result of heart problems, after reaching the final stopping point of the ascent. In March 2007, despite a lifelong fear of heights, Fiennes climbed the Eiger by its North Face, with sponsorship totalling £1.8 million to be paid to the Marie Curie Cancer Care Delivering Choice Programme. Kenton Cool first met Fiennes in 2004, and subsequently guided him in the Alps and Himalayas.

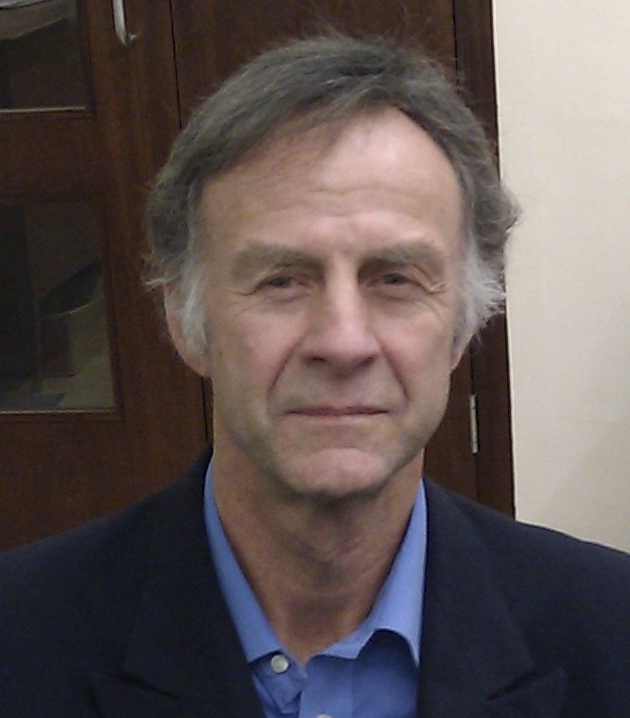
Fiennes in 2011

In 2008 Fiennes made his second attempt to climb Mount Everest, getting to within 400 metres (1,300 ft) of the summit before bad timing and bad weather stopped the expedition. On 20 May 2009 Fiennes reached the summit of Mount Everest, becoming the oldest British person to achieve this. Fiennes also became the first person to have climbed Everest and crossed both polar ice-caps. Of the other handful of adventurers who had visited both poles, only four had successfully crossed both polar icecaps: Norwegian Børge Ousland, Belgian Alain Hubert and Fiennes, and one other. In successfully reaching the summit of Everest in 2009 Fiennes became the first person to achieve all three goals. Ousland wrote to congratulate him.

In September 2012 it was announced that Fiennes was to lead the first attempt to cross Antarctica during the southern winter, in aid of the charity Seeing is Believing, an initiative to prevent avoidable blindness. The six-man team was dropped off by ship at Crown Bay in Queen Maud Land in January 2013, and waited until the Southern Hemisphere's autumnal equinox on 21 March 2013 before embarking across the ice shelf. The team would ascend 10,000 feet (3,000 m) onto the inland plateau, and head to the South Pole. The intention was for Fiennes and his skiing partner, Dr Mike Stroud, to lead on foot and be followed by two bulldozers dragging industrial sledges.

Fiennes had to pull out of the Coldest Journey expedition on 25 February 2013 because of frostbite and was evacuated from Antarctica.

=== Author ===
Fiennes' career as an author has developed alongside his career as an explorer: he is the author of 24 fiction and non-fiction books, including The Feather Men. In 2003, he published a biography of Captain Robert Falcon Scott which attempted to provide a robust defence of Scott's achievements and reputation, which had been strongly questioned by biographers such as Roland Huntford. Although others have made comparisons between Fiennes and Scott, Fiennes says he identifies more with Lawrence Oates, another member of Scott's doomed Antarctic team.

=== Political views ===
Fiennes stood for the Countryside Party in the 2004 European elections in the South West England region, fifth on their list of six. The party received 30,824 votes, insufficient for any of their candidates to be elected. Contrary to some reports, he has never been an official patron of the UK Independence Party. He is a member of the libertarian pressure group The Freedom Association. In August 2014, Fiennes was one of 200 public figures who were signatories to a letter to The Guardian opposing Scottish independence in the run-up to September's referendum on that issue.

=== Media appearances ===
As a guest on the British motoring television programme Top Gear, as a Star in a Reasonably Priced Car, his test track lap time, in a Suzuki Liana was 1:51, putting him 26th out of 65. He also appeared in the Polar Special episode, casually berating the three hosts for their flippant attitude toward the dangers of the Arctic.

According to an interview on Top Gear, Fiennes was considered for the role of James Bond during the casting process, making it to the final six contenders, but was rejected by Cubby Broccoli for having "hands too big and a face like a farmer", and Roger Moore was eventually chosen. Fiennes related this tale again during one of his appearances on Countdown, in which he referred also to a brief film career that included an appearance alongside Liz Fraser.

Between 1 and 5 October 2012, and again from 13 to 19 November 2013, Fiennes was the celebrity guest in "Dictionary Corner" on the Channel 4 game show Countdown, and provided interludes based on his life stories and explorations.

Fiennes was an expert guest commentator on the PBS documentary Chasing Shackleton, broadcast in January 2014. He makes a number of corporate and after-dinner speeches.

In 2019, Fiennes appeared in a three-part National Geographic documentary Egypt with the World's Greatest Explorer (also titled Fiennes Return to Egypt) with his cousin and actor Joseph Fiennes that re-traced his first expedition in Egypt in the 1960s.

== Personal life ==
Fiennes married his childhood sweetheart and fellow adventurer, Virginia "Ginny" Pepper on 9 September 1970. They ran a country farm estate on Exmoor, Somerset, where they raised cattle and sheep. Ginny built up a herd of Aberdeen Angus cattle while Fiennes was away on his expeditions. She was the first woman to receive the Polar Medal in recognition of her research work into VLF radio propagation. She also conceived, organised, and participated in the Transglobe Expedition. The two remained married until her death from stomach cancer in February 2004.

In 2005, Fiennes married Louise Millington. Their daughter was born in April 2006. Fiennes also has a stepson through Millington.

Fiennes is a member of the Worshipful Company of Vintners and the Highland Society of London, and is an honorary member of the Travellers Club.

In 2003, shortly after boarding a flight to Scotland from Bristol Airport, Fiennes suffered a heart attack. He underwent emergency bypass surgery.

On 6 March 2010, Fiennes was involved in a three-car collision in Stockport that resulted in minor injuries to himself and serious injuries to the driver of another car. He had been in Stockport to participate in the annual High Peak Marathon in Derbyshire as part of a veterans' team known as Poles Apart, which won the veterans' trophy in just over 12 hours despite the freezing conditions.

Diagnosed with Parkinson's disease in 2019, Fiennes was open about the disease and his life with it. From October 2024, Fiennes retreated from public appearances with failing health, and has been residing in a series of care homes. As of October 2026, he is living in a specialist dementia unit in a care home, and he is currently allowed some visits from friends and relations. In January 2026, the Care Inspectorate of Wales ruled that he was being unlawfully deprived of liberty, since his wife, who has lasting power of attorney, had not filed the required Deprivation of Liberty Safeguards document. The Office of the Public Guardian has responded to communications that the case is outside its remit.

== Awards and recognition ==
In 1970, while serving with the Omani Army, Fiennes received the Sultan's Bravery Medal. He has also been awarded a number of honorary doctorates, the first in 1986 by Loughborough University, followed in 1995 by University of Central England, in 2000 by University of Portsmouth, 2002 by Glasgow Caledonian University, 2005 by University of Sheffield, 2007 by University of Abertay Dundee and September 2011 by University of Plymouth. Fiennes later received the Royal Geographical Society's Founder's Medal.

He was the subject of This Is Your Life in 1982 when he was surprised by Eamonn Andrews.

In 1983, he was awarded The Explorers Medal by The Explorers Club. In 2021, he was named an Honorary Member, the club's highest honour, and one that can only be held by twenty living individuals.

Fiennes was appointed Officer of the Order of the British Empire in 1993 for "human endeavour and for charitable services": in 2015 it was reported his expeditions have raised £16 million for good causes.

In 1986, Fiennes was awarded the Polar Medal for "outstanding service to British Polar exploration and research." In 1994 he was awarded a second clasp to the Polar Medal, having visited both poles. He remains the only person to have received a double clasp for both the Arctic and Antarctica.

In May 2007, Fiennes received ITV's Greatest Britons Award for Sport beating fellow nominees Lewis Hamilton and Joe Calzaghe. In October 2007 Fiennes ranked 94th (tied with five others) in a list of the "Top 100 living geniuses" published by The Daily Telegraph.

In late 2008/early 2009, Fiennes took part in a new BBC programme called Top Dogs: Adventures in War, Sea and Ice, in which he teamed with fellow Britons John Simpson, the BBC News world affairs editor, and Sir Robin Knox-Johnston, the round-the-world yachtsman. The team undertook three trips, with each team member experiencing the other's adventure field. The first episode, aired on 27 March 2009, saw Fiennes, Simpson and Knox-Johnston go on a news-gathering trip to Afghanistan. The team reported from the Khyber Pass and the Tora Bora mountain complex. In the other two episodes they undertook a voyage around Cape Horn and an expedition hauling sledges across the deep-frozen Frobisher Bay in the far north of Canada.

In 2010, Fiennes was named as the UK's top celebrity fundraiser by Justgiving, after raising more than £2.5 million for Marie Curie Cancer Care over the previous two years – more than any other celebrity fundraiser featured on JustGiving.com during the same period.

In September 2011, Fiennes was awarded an honorary Doctorate in Science from Plymouth University and, in July 2012, he was awarded an Honorary Fellowship from the University of Glamorgan.

In December 2012, Fiennes was named one of the Men of the Year for 2012 by Top Gear magazine.

In 2014 Fiennes received an honorary Doctorate of Science from the University of Chester, in recognition of "outstanding and inspirational contribution to the field of exploration".

On 14 July 2022, the documentary film Explorer was released, which focused on Fiennes and his exploits and includes both contemporary and archive footage.

Ribbon	Description	Notes
	Baronet (Bt)	1944
	Officer of the Order of the British Empire (OBE)	1993
	Polar Medal & Two Clasps	First clasp: 1986; Second clasp: 1994
	Midal Jura'at us-Sultan ul-Battuli (Sultan's Bravery Medal) Oman	1970

== Works ==
- A Talent for Trouble (1970). ISBN 978-0340128459.
- Ice Fall in Norway (1972). ISBN 978-0749319083.
- The Headless Valley (1973). ISBN 978-0340158722.
- Where Soldiers fear to tread (1976). ISBN 978-0340147542.
- Hell on Ice (1979). ISBN 978-0340222157.
- To the Ends of the Earth: The Transglobe Expedition, the First Pole-to-pole Circumnavigation of the Globe (1983). ISBN 978-0877954903.
- Bothie the Polar Dog (1984). ISBN 0-340-36319-3 (co-authored with Virginia Fiennes).
- Living Dangerously (1988), Time Warner Paperbacks. ISBN 978-0-7515-0434-7.
- The Feather Men (1991), the book upon which the 2011 film Killer Elite is based.
- Atlantis of the Sands (1992), Bloomsbury. ISBN 0-7475-1327-9.
- Mind over Matter: The Epic Crossing of the Antarctic Continent (1994), Delacorte Press. ISBN 978-0385312165.
- The Sett (1997), Mandarin. ISBN 978-0749321611.
- Discovery Road (1998), TravellersEye Ltd. ISBN 978-0-9530575-3-5 (with T. Garratt and A. Brown).
- Fit for Life (1999), Little, Brown & Co. ISBN 0-316-85263-5.
- Home of the Blizzard: A True Story of Antarctic Survival, Birlinn Ltd. ISBN 978-1-84158-077-7 (by Sir Douglas Mawson, foreword by Ranulph Fiennes).
- Just for the Love of it: The First Woman to Climb Mount Everest from Both Sides (2000), Free to Decide Publishing. ISBN 978-0-620-24782-5 (by Cathy O'Dowd, foreword by Ranulph Fiennes).
- Across the Frozen Himalaya: The Epic Winter Ski Traverse from Karakoram to Lipu Lekh (2000), Indus Publishing Company. ISBN 978-81-7387-106-1 (by Harish Kohli, foreword by Ranulph Fiennes).
- The Antarctic Dictionary: A Complete Guide to Antarctic English (2000), Museum Victoria Publishing, ISBN 978-0-9577471-1-1 (by Bernadette Hince, foreword by Ranulph Fiennes).
- Beyond the Limits (2000), Little, Brown & Co, ISBN 978-0-316-85706-2.
- The Secret Hunters (2002), Time Warner Paperbacks. ISBN 978-0-7515-3193-0.
- Captain Scott (2003), Hodder & Stoughton. ISBN 978-0-340-82697-3.
- Race to the Pole: Tragedy, Heroism, and Scott's Antarctic Quest (2005), Hyperion; reprint edition. ISBN 978-0786888580.
- Above the World: Stunning Satellite Images From Above Earth (2005), Cassell Illustrated, a division of the Octopus Publishing Group. ISBN 978-1-84403-181-8 (foreword by Ranulph Fiennes).
- Moods of Future Joys (2007), Adlibbed Ltd. ISBN 978-1-897312-38-4 (by Alastair Humphreys, foreword by Ranulph Fiennes).
- Extreme Running (2007), Pavilion Books. ISBN 978-1-86205-756-2 (by Dave Horsley and Kym McConnell, foreword by Ranulph Fiennes).
- Travels with My Heart: The Essential Guide for Travellers with Heart Conditions (2007), Matador. ISBN 978-1-905886-88-3 (by Robin Liston, foreword by Ranulph Fiennes).
- Face to Face: Polar Portraits (2008), The Scott Polar Research Institute with Polarworld, ISBN 978-0-901021-07-6 (with Huw Lewis-Jones, Hugh Brody and Martin Hartley (photographer)).
- 8 More Tales from the Travellers: A Further Collection of Tales by Members of the Travellers Club, M. Tomkinson Publishing. ISBN 978-0-905500-74-4 (with Sir Chris Bonington, Sandy Gall and others).
- Mad, Bad and Dangerous to Know (2008), Hodder & Stoughton. ISBN 978-0-340-95169-9.
- Mad Dogs and Englishmen: An Expedition Round My Family (2010), Hodder & Stoughton. ISBN 978-0-340-92504-1.
- Running Beyond Limits: The Adventures of an Ultra Marathon Runner (2011), Mountain Media. ISBN 978-0-9562957-2-9 (by Andrew Murray, introduction by Ranulph Fiennes).
- Killer Elite (2011), Hodder & Stoughton Ltd. ISBN 978-1-4447-0792-2 (previously published as The Feather Men).
- My Heroes: Extraordinary Courage, Exceptional People (2011), Hodder & Stoughton Ltd. ISBN 978-1-4447-2242-0.
- The Last Expedition (2012), Vintage Classics. ISBN 978-0-09-956138-5 (by Captain Robert Falcon Scott, new edition introduction by Ranulph Fiennes).
- Cold: Extreme Adventures at the Lowest Temperatures on Earth (2013), Simon & Schuster. ISBN 978-1-47112-782-3.
- Heat: Extreme Adventures at the Highest Temperatures on Earth (2015). ISBN 1471137953.
- Agincourt: The Fight for France (2015), Pegasus. ISBN 978-1-60598-915-0.
- Fear: Our Ultimate Challenge (2016), Hodder & Stoughton. ISBN 978-1-473-61798-8.
- Colder: The Illustrated Story of Britain's Greatest Polar Explorer (2016). ISBN 9781471153556.
- The Elite: The Story of Special Forces – From Ancient Sparta to the War on Terror (2019). ISBN 9781471156618.
- Shackleton: A Biography (2021), Michael Joseph. ISBN 9780241356715.
- Lawrence of Arabia (2023). ISBN 9780241450611.
- Around the World in 80 Years: A Life of Exploration (2024). ISBN 9781399729758.

== See also ==
- Bothie (dog)

== Notes ==
Baronetage of the United Kingdom
Preceded by Sir Ranulph Twisleton-Wykeham-Fiennes	Baronet (of Banbury); 1944–current	Succeeded by no heir
