= Ginny Fiennes =

British explorer

- Born: Virginia Frances Pepper; 9 July 1947; Godalming, Surrey, England
- Died: 20 February 2004 (aged 56)
- Occupations: Explorer, author, farmer
- Spouse: Ranulph Fiennes (m. 1970)
- Awards: Polar Medal

Virginia Frances, Lady Twisleton-Wykeham-Fiennes (née Pepper; 9 July 1947 – 20 February 2004), known as Ginny Fiennes, was an English explorer. She was the first woman to be awarded the Polar Medal, and the first woman to be voted in to join the Antarctic Club in recognition of her research work for the British Antarctic Survey and University of Sheffield into very low frequency radio propagation. Her husband was adventurer Ranulph Fiennes.

== Early life ==
She was born Virginia Frances Pepper in Godalming, Surrey in 1947. Her family owned chalk quarries in Amberley on the South Downs: now Amberley Museum & Heritage Centre. When she was 9, she met the 12-year-old Ranulph Fiennes, her future husband, and they married in 1970. After school, she took up deep-sea diving and was recruited to work for two years in Wester Ross for the National Trust for Scotland. She was also trained at the Royal Aircraft Establishment, Farnborough, took marine radio officer courses and joined the Women's Royal Army Corps Territorials.

== Career ==
In 1968, she organised the first ascent of the longest river in the world, the River Nile, by prototype hovercraft. In 1971, she organised the first transnavigation of British Columbia, entirely by river. In 1972, she was commissioned by Woman's Own magazine to live for two months with an Omani family, and later organised four expeditions with her husband to locate the lost frankincense city of Ubar in Dhofar.

In 1972, she devised a plan to circumnavigate the world along its polar axis, and ten years later her Transglobe Expedition team became the first to reach both poles, to cross Antarctica and the Arctic Ocean, through the North West Passage.

In 2020 the Government of the British Antarctic Territory honoured the contribution she made to "furthering the understanding, protection and management of Antarctica" by naming Mount Fiennes.

=== Author ===
In 1984 she released the non-fiction book Bothie the Polar Dog. Co-authored with her husband, Sir Ranulph Fiennes, it describes the adventures of her Jack Russell Terrier named Bothie who was the "only dog ever to set paw on both the South and North poles".

== Family life ==
In the 1980s, she moved to Exmoor National Park and began to raise a herd of pedigree Aberdeen Angus cattle and a flock of black Welsh Mountain sheep.

In November 2003, she was found to be suffering from stomach cancer, diagnosed on the day after her husband returned from running seven marathons in seven days on seven continents. She died on 20 February 2004, aged 56.
