= Sex Education series 1 =

Season of television series

Sex Education
- Series 1
- Promotional poster
- Starring: Asa Butterfield; Gillian Anderson; Ncuti Gatwa; Emma Mackey; Connor Swindells; Kedar Williams-Stirling; Alistair Petrie; Mimi Keene; Aimee Lou Wood; Simone Ashley; Tanya Reynolds; Patricia Allison; Mikael Persbrandt
- No. of episodes: 8

Release
- Original network: Netflix
- Original release: 11 January 2019

Series chronology
- Next → Series 2

The first series of the British teen sex comedy drama programme Sex Education premiered with all episodes on 11 January 2019 on Netflix. The series follows the lives of the teenagers and adults in the fictional town of Moordale as they contend with various personal dilemmas, often related to sexual intimacy. The series stars an ensemble cast that includes Asa Butterfield, Gillian Anderson, Ncuti Gatwa, Emma Mackey, Connor Swindells, Kedar Williams-Stirling, Alistair Petrie, Mimi Keene, Aimee Lou Wood, Simone Ashley, Tanya Reynolds, Patricia Allison and Mikael Persbrandt. The programme was renewed for a second series in February 2019.

== Cast and characters ==
=== Main ===
- Asa Butterfield as Otis Milburn
- Gillian Anderson as Jean Milburn
- Ncuti Gatwa as Eric Effiong
- Emma Mackey as Maeve Wiley
- Connor Swindells as Adam Groff
- Kedar Williams-Stirling as Jackson Marchetti
- Alistair Petrie as Michael Groff
- Mimi Keene as Ruby Matthews
- Aimee Lou Wood as Aimee Gibbs
- Chaneil Kular as Anwar Bakshi
- Simone Ashley as Olivia Hanan
- Tanya Reynolds as Lily Iglehart
- Patricia Allison as Ola Nyman
- Mikael Persbrandt as Jakob Nyman

=== Recurring ===
- Jim Howick as Colin Hendricks
- Samantha Spiro as Maureen Groff
- Hannah Waddingham as Sofia Marchetti
- Sharon Duncan-Brewster as Roz Marchetti
- DeObia Oparei as Abeo Effiong
- Doreene Blackstock as Beatrice Effiong
- Chris Jenks as Steve Morley
- Lisa Palfrey as Cynthia
- Joe Wilkinson as Jeffrey
- Jojo Macari as Kyle
- Edward Bluemel as Sean Wiley
- Rakhee Thakrar as Emily Sands
- Daniel Ings as Dan

=== Guest ===
- Toby Williams as Tim
- Lu Corfield as Sarah
- Anjana Vasan as an anti-abortion activist
- Dominic Applewhite as Charlie
- James Purefoy as Remi Milburn

== Episodes ==
| No. overall | No. in series | Episode | Directed by | Written by | Original release date |
|---|---|---|---|---|---|
| 1 | 1 | Episode 1 | Ben Taylor | Laurie Nunn | 11 January 2019 |
Otis, a sixth-form student whose mother Jean is a sex therapist, struggles with his inability to masturbate. His best friend Eric, who is openly gay, informs him that everyone else in their class had sex over the summer. Adam, the school bully and son of the headmaster, is unable to have an orgasm with his girlfriend Aimee, who shares her troubles with her friend Maeve. When Adam goes to Otis's house to work on a school project, he discovers Jean's sexual paraphernalia and exposes this to the whole school the next day. Otis flees the classroom in embarrassment and Maeve goes after him. They find Adam in the abandoned gym lavatory, alarmed at his priapism after taking three Viagra pills. Adam explains the stresses that led him to take it – he is the son of the headmaster and students gossip about his large penis – and Otis advises him to "own his narrative". Adam attempts to do this by exposing his penis in the school cafeteria. He is then able to achieve orgasm with Aimee but she breaks up with him out of embarrassment. Maeve is inspired by Otis's success in helping Adam and proposes that they run a sex therapy clinic at the school and split the profits, with Maeve handling the logistics and Otis providing the therapy.
| 2 | 2 | Episode 2 | Ben Taylor | Laurie Nunn | 11 January 2019 |
Aimee hosts a house party where Otis and Maeve attempt to find clients by giving out free advice. Otis provides valuable therapy to a couple who injured themselves while attempting sex. Eric attempts to teach girls how to properly perform fellatio, but Olivia gags while practising on a banana and she vomits. Adam breaks into the party and finds Aimee talking to Kyle; he smashes an urn filled with Aimee's grandmother's ashes over Kyle's head. Jean struggles with Otis being distant from her while Otis feels that she is too intrusive. Maeve discovers that she is pregnant; she has casual sex with school head boy Jackson to distract herself, but Jackson wants a more concrete relationship. Dejected about her pregnancy, Maeve tells Otis she plans to call off the sex therapy enterprise. The next day several students approach Otis for advice. Encouraged, Otis tells Maeve he intends to continue with the plan.
| 3 | 3 | Episode 3 | Ben Taylor | Sophie Goodhart | 11 January 2019 |
Otis has a wet dream about Maeve, which he unsuccessfully tries to hide from Jean. Maeve wants to have an abortion but finds out that the clinic requires that someone be with her after the procedure. Otis agrees to do this, but does not understand the situation and thinks that it is a date. Eric is selected for the school's swing band, and clarinetist Lily offers to help him catch up. Lily tries to have sex with Eric at his house but when she discovers he is gay they end up playing with makeup and watching gay pornography instead. Otis goes to the abortion clinic early and discovers the truth. He offers relationship advice to a pro-life couple protesting outside. Otis walks Maeve home and they share a heartfelt hug. Jackson wins a swimming gala but his mother continues to pressure him to achieve more. He is sad to see that Maeve did not attend.
| 4 | 4 | Episode 4 | Ben Taylor | Laura Neal and Laurie Nunn | 11 January 2019 |
Maeve and Otis continue texting, while Jackson looks for ways to ask Maeve to be his girlfriend. Jackson approaches Otis for advice and offers to pay him. Otis attempts to return the money and unwittingly tells Jackson about Maeve's interests; Jackson uses this to get closer to Maeve. Jean is attracted to Jakob, the handyman who is fixing her bathroom, and Otis meets Jakob's daughter Ola. Eric gets a job as a dog walker. Adam's dog runs off while Eric is walking it and Adam gets in trouble with his father. Lily asks Otis if he wants to have sex with her, as they are both virgins, but he declines. Maeve and Otis play-fight in the school swimming pool; Otis gets an erection, which he hides from her. When Jackson again asks Otis for advice on how to ask Maeve out, Otis attempts to sabotage him by suggesting that Jackson make a grand gesture. Jackson's gesture (singing "Love Really Hurts Without You" to the accompaniment of the swing band) works, though, and Maeve agrees to be his girlfriend.
| 5 | 5 | Episode 5 | Kate Herron | Sophie Goodhart and Laura Hunter | 11 January 2019 |
Jackson and Maeve have been dating for a month and he invites her for dinner to meet his parents. When they enquire about Maeve's parents she sneaks out of the back door. She apologises to Jackson and tells him about her dysfunctional family, prompting Jackson to talk about his insecurities. Otis and Eric plan to attend the musical Hedwig and the Angry Inch in full costume for Eric's birthday as part of a yearly tradition. Maeve and Otis try to find out who is disseminating a photograph of their client Ruby's vagina and discover that it was Ruby's friend Olivia. While solving the photo mystery, Otis misses his rendezvous with Eric. Eric's phone and wallet are stolen, and he is assaulted by two homophobes on the way home. He calls Jean and she picks him up; when Otis returns home, he and Eric have a row, and both storm off.
| 6 | 6 | Episode 6 | Kate Herron | Laurie Nunn and Freddy Syborn | 11 January 2019 |
In a flashback, Otis witnesses an event that led to his parents' divorce when he catches his father Remi having sex with a patient. In the present, Remi is visiting Jean and Otis. Otis takes his advice to take Lily up on her offer to have sex with him, but has a panic attack when her advances trigger his childhood memories. Eric is increasingly isolated and tries to dress more "normally". He lashes out at a teacher, punches Anwar, and gets suspended. Eric's father unsuccessfully tries to connect with him. Adam wins an essay competition with an essay he had paid Maeve to write. Miss Sands correctly guesses that Maeve wrote the essay and informs Mr Groff, who is already suspicious. Otis advises Aimee, whose new boyfriend Steve insists that she should stop pretending and actually have sex that she enjoys. Jean and Jakob become intimate. Maeve's brother Sean returns after having disappeared for several months; they reconcile after some tense moments. Otis is trying to sort out his feelings for Maeve but is caught off guard when Ola asks him out. He nervously accepts, unaware that Maeve has realised her own feelings for him.
| 7 | 7 | Episode 7 | Kate Herron | Sophie Goodhart | 11 January 2019 |
Maeve and Otis do not want to go to the school dance, but Jackson and Ola convince them otherwise. Maeve tries to sabotage Ola and Otis's relationship, but Ola is unaffected; when she tries to connect with Otis, he unwittingly insults her and she leaves. Eric goes to the dance in drag and reconciles with Otis. At the dance, Otis's client Liam threatens to jump off a ledge, but Otis talks him down, giving an impassioned speech about unrequited love. Unbeknown to Otis, Maeve is shaken by his speech and Jackson notices her reaction. Otis tells Maeve that he feels responsible for the incident and wants to shut down their therapy business. Jackson drunkenly confesses that he paid Otis for advice on winning Maeve over. Maeve angrily terminates her partnership and friendship with Otis and storms off. Jackson gets into a fight with his mother and returns to Maeve, professing his love for her. Adam has a physical altercation with his father, straining their already troubled relationship. When Jakob opens up to Jean about his wish for a committed relationship, she turns him down. Otis finds a draft of his mother's new book, which details his sexual frustrations.
| 8 | 8 | Episode 8 | Kate Herron | Laurie Nunn | 11 January 2019 |
Mr Groff finds drugs that Sean sold at the dance and assumes Maeve and Otis are responsible. He threatens to report Sean to the police but Maeve takes responsibility to protect him, making her open to expulsion. She defends herself in front of a tribunal but the decision is deferred. Jackson starts skipping swimming practice after Maeve tells him she does not love him. He agrees to compete again if Maeve is reinstated but the headmaster reneges on the deal. Eric and Adam are in detention together; a physical altercation between them suddenly turns into a sexual encounter. Their relationship ends when Adam is shipped off to military school. Otis fights with Jean about her intrusiveness but they reconcile. Jean goes to tell Jakob she can no longer see him but ends up having sex with him again. Otis apologises to Ola, who accepts and walks with him back to his house. Sean has disappeared. Maeve finds Adam's essay prize, which Otis stole from the school office for her, and a note of apology. She goes to his house but sees him kissing Ola and leaves without them noticing. The kiss arouses Otis and he is finally able to masturbate.

== Production ==
=== Development ===
Sex Education was created by Laurie Nunn. On 28 November 2017, it was announced that Netflix had given the programme a series order, with Ben Taylor expected to direct. Executive producers were set to include Jamie Campbell and Joel Wilson via their production company Eleven Film. On 4 December 2018, it was announced that the series would premiere on 11 January 2019. On 1 February 2019, Netflix renewed the programme for a second series.

=== Casting ===
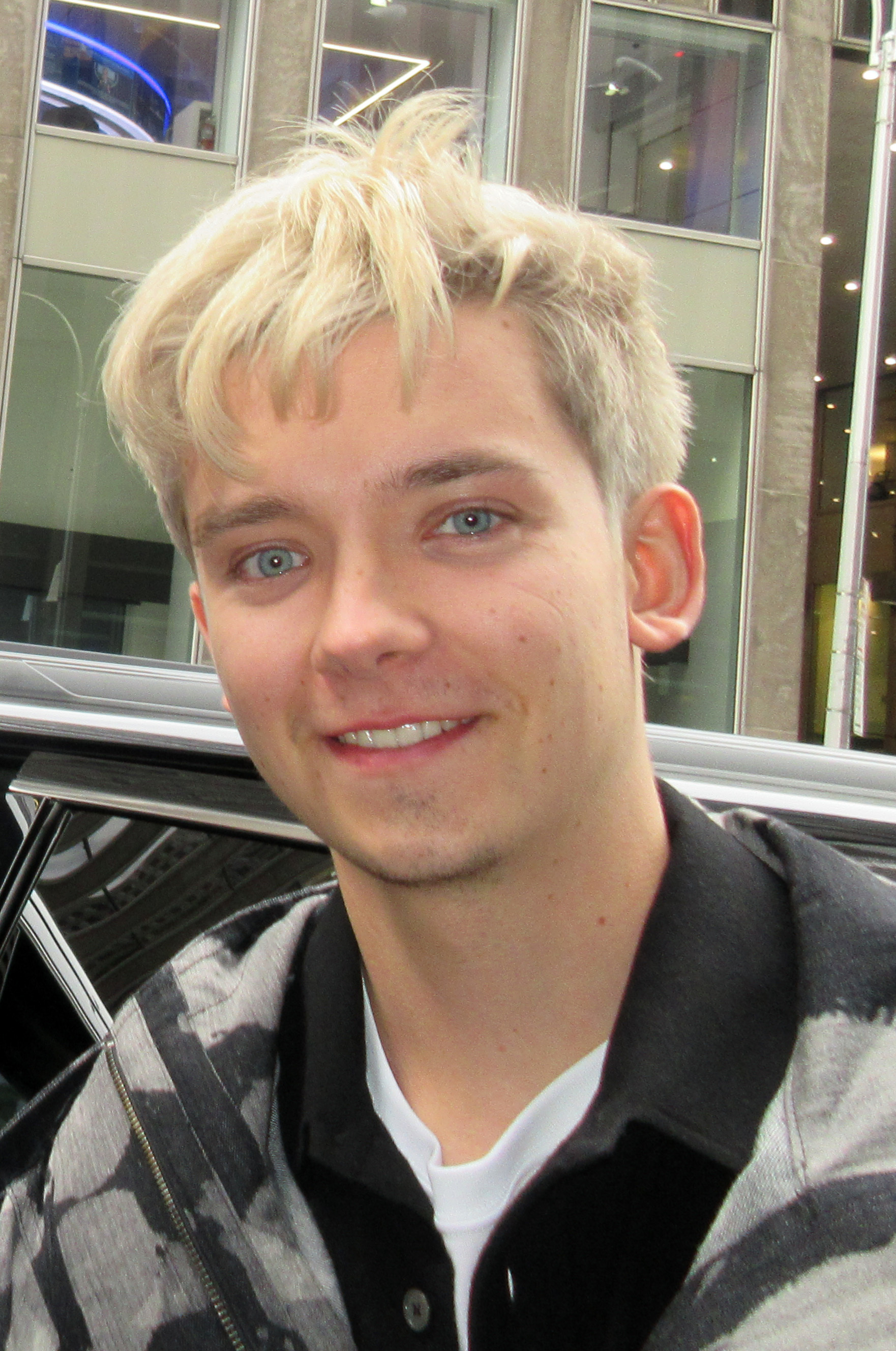
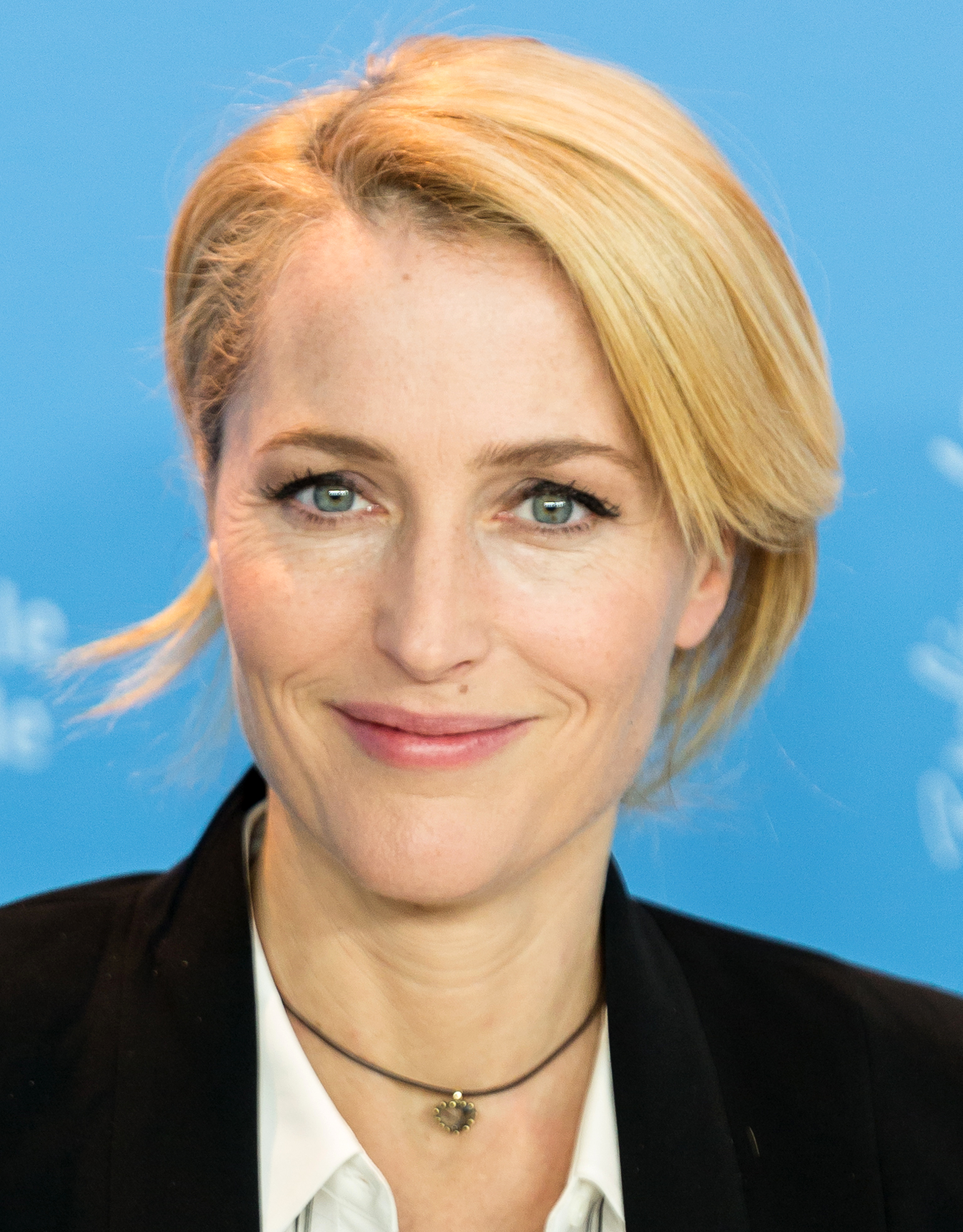
Asa Butterfield and Gillian Anderson receive top billing for the season.

On 17 May 2018, it was announced that Asa Butterfield would be starring in the series as Otis Thompson (Note: The character's name was later changed to Otis Milburn.) opposite Gillian Anderson. Emma Mackey, Ncuti Gatwa, Connor Swindells and Kedar Williams-Stirling were also confirmed to be part of the series' main cast. On 16 July 2018, it was reported that James Purefoy had been cast in a recurring role.

=== Writing ===
Five of the eight episodes were written by Nunn, with the rest being written by Sophie Goodhart, Laura Neal, Laura Hunte and Freddy Syborn.

=== Filming ===
Filming for the series took place at several locations in the Wye Valley in both Wales and England, including Llandogo, Tintern, Symonds Yat, Monmouth, and Redbrook. Filming was also progressed in Penarth, Vale of Glamorgan during 2018. Scenes set in the swimming pool were filmed at the Newport International Sports Village complex. The scenes set at Moordale Secondary School were filmed at the former campus of the University of South Wales in Caerleon, Newport.

== Release ==
On 2 January 2019, the official trailer for the series was released. All episodes of the series were released on 11 January 2019 on Netflix.

== Reception ==
=== Audience viewership ===
On 17 January 2019, Netflix announced that the series was on pace to have been streamed by over 40 million viewers within its first month of release.

=== Critical response ===
Review aggregation website Rotten Tomatoes reports that 91% of 80 critic ratings were positive for the first series, with an average rating of 8.10/10. The website's critical consensus reads, "Bawdy, heartfelt, and surprisingly wise, Sex Education is a raucous romp through a group of teenagers whose sexual misadventures are so thoughtfully rendered, adults could learn a thing or two from them." Metacritic calculated a weighted average score of 79 out of 100 from 19 critics, indicating "generally favourable reviews".

In a positive review, IndieWire's Liz Shannon Miller gave the series a grade of "A−" saying, "Again, though, it's the kids' story, with the fluctuations in both friendships and relationships pinging back and forth with youthful verve. Sex Education does a lot of things really well, chief amongst them being the creation of a high school world which feels fully developed — realistic to a degree, but.. [with] a sense of escapism." The Daily Mirror's Lewis Knight awarded it a rating of five out of five, noting that with "a talented ensemble and explicit tackling of sexuality in young people (and their parents)", it "is an hilariously honest and refreshingly diverse comedy". The New York Times's James Poniewozik described the series as "timely but not hamfistedly topical, feminist, with a refreshing lack of angst about its subject. Sex, in this show, isn't an 'issue' or a problem or a titillating lure: It's an aspect of health".

In a mixed assessment, The Washington Post's Hank Stuever wrote, "there's the usual problem of Netflix drift for an episode or two midway through, where the plot dawdles while the writers and producers figure out an ending. Yet there's an artfulness to the material and a genuine care on display here, too — a message that we are not just about the size and shape and inventive uses of our private parts". In a negative review, The Independent's Ed Power gave the series a rating of two out of five and criticised it, saying, "Sex Education suffers further for not being grounded in a distinctive time and place...Eager to please but confused, Sex Education could do with a stint on the therapist's couch itself".

Ncuti Gatwa, who plays gay black teen Eric Effiong, has received praise from critics and cultural commentators, who noted his role was not relegated to the cliché of a gay or black "best friend" stock character. The series gained acclaim for its treatment of intimate content and use of an intimacy coordinator, Ita O'Brien.
