= Rydon Community College =

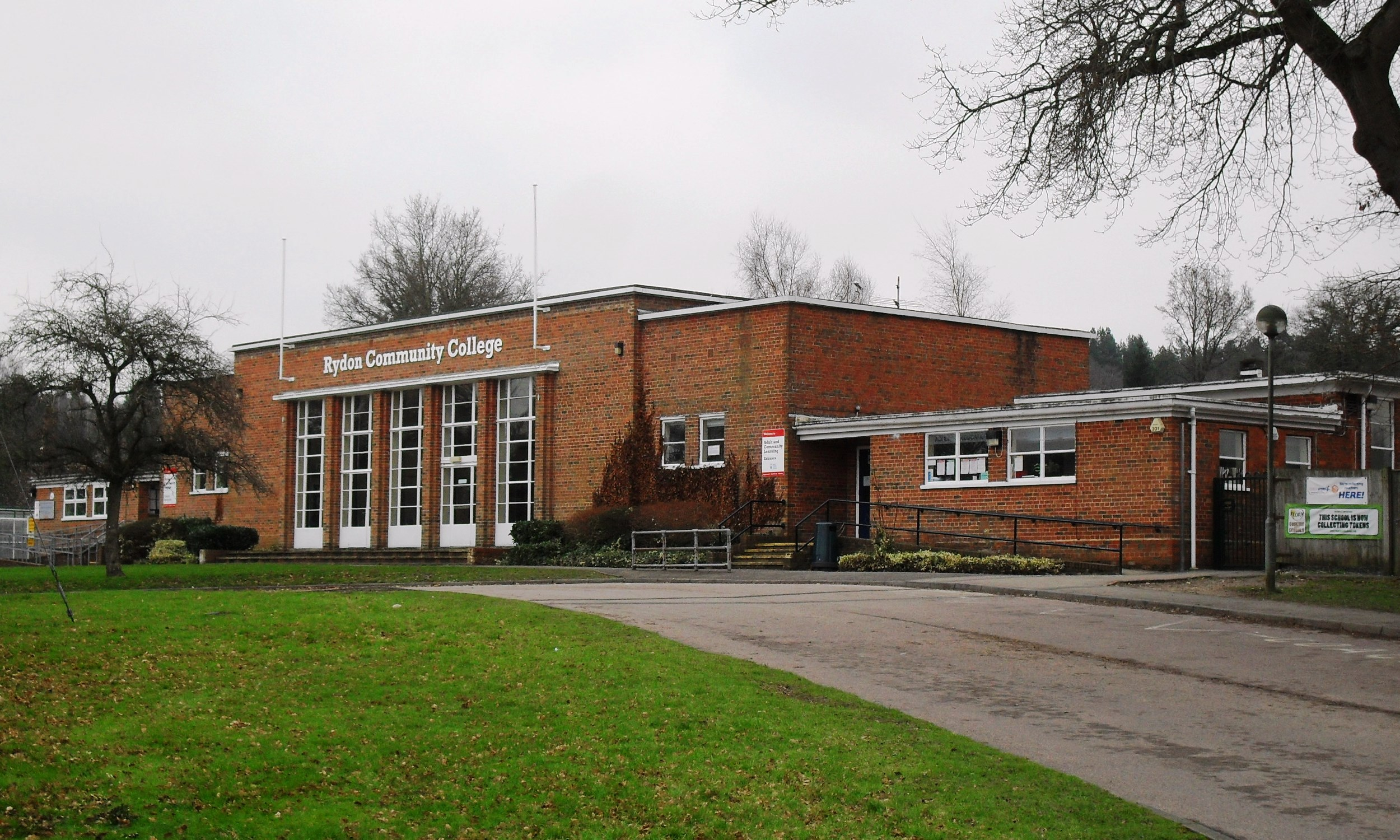

Location
- Rock Road; Storrington, West Sussex, RH20 3AA; England; 50.9233°N 0.4352°W

Information
- Type: Middle-deemed-secondary school
- Established: 1940
- Closed: 2017
- Local authority: West Sussex County Council
- Specialist: Business and Enterprise College, Science College
- Department for Education URN: 126067 Tables
- Ofsted: Reports
- Chair of Governors: Alan Brien
- Head teacher: A. Murphy
- Staff: 30
- Gender: Mixed
- Age: 10 to 13
- Enrolment: 400
- Houses: Arun, Chanctonbury, Downs and Weald
- Website: http://www.rydon.w-sussex.sch.uk/

Rydon Community College was a maintained comprehensive middle-deemed-secondary school for pupils aged 10 to 13. The school was located just outside Storrington, West Sussex, England, in the village of Sullington. It was one of only 7 schools of its type in the United Kingdom, and had around 400 pupils. Rydon had specialisms in Science College and Business and Enterprise College . All subjects were taught to Year 6 pupils and above as secondary pupils. The school permanently closed in July 2017.

== History ==
The school was first opened in 1940 as the Storrington council senior school. It was developed and extended over the following years, being renamed as Rydon county secondary school. The roll continued to rise until the mid-1960s, but had fallen to just 328 by 1968. Accordingly, in 1969, the school was modified to become an intermediate school offering education for pupils aged between 10 and 13 years.

In 2002, consultations were undertaken to review provision in the area to revert to the more usual two-tier structure of education. However, a parental ballot demonstrated clear support for the existing arrangements, and the status quo emerged as the preferred option. Further consultations in 2015 led to the announcement of the closure of the school from July 2017, at which point it became a campus of Steyning Grammar School for pupils in Years 7 and 8.

== Campus ==
The campus was in a rural area, just north of the village of Storrington in West Sussex. The school was largely housed in original buildings from original secondary school opened during World War II. Several additions and adaptations were made, including creating a new two-storey classroom block to replace the old 'West Block' which was taken over by Thakeham Primary School. The school huts were also demolished to make way for the new extension.

== Organisation ==
Pupils in the school were organised into three year groups, aligned to the National Curriculum years of Year 6, Year 7 and Year 8. Pupils were taught mainly by specialist teachers as in secondary schools, although pupils in the first year of the school were in Key Stage 2.

== Notable former pupils ==
- Connor Swindells, actor (Sex Education, Vigil)
