= Peter Noyes =

Peter Noyes may refer to:

- Peter Noyes (academic administrator), former vice-chancellor of University of Wales, Newport
- Peter Noyes (journalist), American newscaster and journalist
- Peter Noyes (MP), English MP for Andover

== Other ==
- Peter Noyes School, Sudbury, Massachusetts
