= Towers Convent School =

The Towers
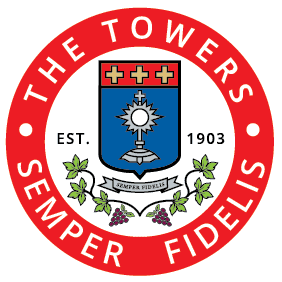

Location
- Henfield Road; Steyning, West Sussex, BN44 3TF; England; 50°52′47″N 0°17′55″W

Information
- School type: Private boarding school
- Motto: Semper Fidelis (Always Faithful)
- Religious affiliation: Roman Catholic
- Established: 1903; 120 years ago
- Closed: 2020
- Department for Education URN: 126124 Tables
- Gender: Female (Male at 4-11)
- Houses: St. Campion St. Howard St. More
- Colors: Blue and Red
- Website: www.thetowersschool.org

The Towers Convent School was a private Roman Catholic boarding and day school for girls aged 4–16 and boys up to age 11 in Upper Beeding near Steyning, West Sussex, England. The building is a French-style chateau in the semi-rural outskirts of Steyning, 4 miles (6.4 km) north of Shoreham-by-Sea.

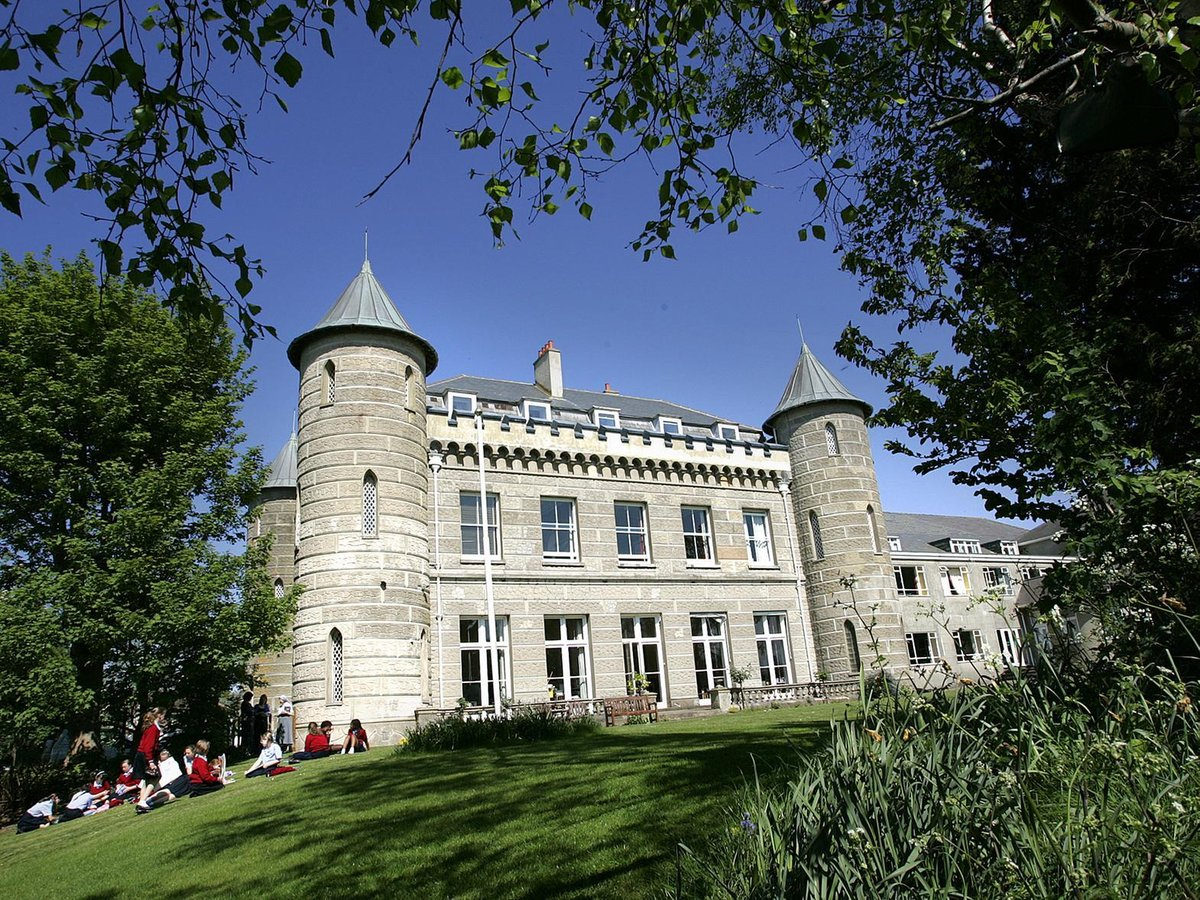
The Tower Convent School Building

== History ==
The Towers was founded by the Sisters of the Blessed Sacrament not to be confused with the order founded by Katharine Drexel. The Sisters left France for England to escape the increasing anti-religious environment, having been invited by Mrs Maling Wynch, a friend of the Congregation, to take up residence at The Towers, at the time leased by her brother-in-law. The first pupils arrived from France in 1903 to begin classes. After renting The Towers for several years, Elizabeth Maling Wynch, later to become Sister Mary Agnes, bought the property, and left it to the congregation in her will.

Due to the decreasing number of pupils, alongside an uncertain economic climate, the Trustees of The Sisters of the Blessed Sacrament made the decision to announce that the school would close at the end of the 2020 academic year. In September 2020, Steyning Grammar School agreed to take a lease of the site to use the premises for their sixth form centre and the Sisters remain residents at The Towers to continue their community work.

=== The Towers ===
The Towers takes its name from the building and its surrounding premises. It was once owned by the Lord of the Manor of Beeding. The Towers was sold to George Smith during the 1870s. The original building was completed in 1883 and was described as a "monument to Victorian extravagance" or "Smith's folly" due to its construction cost. The Towers was turned into a hunting lodge before the Sisters took over. The original buildings were designated Grade II listed buildings in 1980.
