= Roger Cecil =

Welsh painter and mixed media artist

Roger Cecil (18 July 1942 – 22 February 2015) was a Welsh painter and mixed media artist.

== Life as an artist ==
Cecil was born in Abertillery, and studied at Newport College of Art (formerly University of Wales, Newport and now the University of South Wales) and St Martin's School of Art. In 1964 he won the David Murray Landscape Award from the Royal Academy, and started a course at the Royal College of Art, but soon gave it up and took up manual work in mines and building sites. At the age of 21, he featured in a BBC TV documentary, The Quiet Rebel, in which he described his commitment to his art and the pressures on him to get a "real job". He later spent some time teaching in Ebbw Vale.

He worked privately in the house in Abertillery in which he had been born and brought up, and was sometimes described as reclusive. He was only persuaded by friends to start exhibiting his work in 1987, and was not affiliated to any artistic group or movement. From the late 1980s, his works were widely exhibited in Wales and elsewhere.

He was known for both his figurative and largely abstract paintings, "rich in imagery, poetry and colour, which are drawn from his environment, the industrial valley towns and mountains." His works often incorporate everyday materials such as sandpaper, primer, and Polyfilla, as well as conventional paint. The critic Sarah Bradford wrote of his work in 1999:

He is very matter-of-fact about procedure and materials. To him painting is a very practical thing. The making is important. He brings the work to life by explaining how he manages to balance method and aesthetics. He tells of the ordinary everyday materials he uses, red oxide, polyfilla, stopping out varnish, grate blacking, and how he builds the work in layers, rubbing and scraping back, burnishing, scratching and scoring to reveal what has gone before. He rarely talks about the pictorial language which has become identifiably his and his alone, the pathways and ladders, the shapes that resemble rows of terraced houses, the scarring of the landscape, the triangle and the cross that is the piece of land at the end of the road where the war memorial stands. This is his private language. He hesitates from imposing his meaning on anyone else, preferring others to come to his work in their own way and on their terms.

== Final years and death ==
In later years Cecil suffered from dementia, and before his death had been treated at Royal Gwent Hospital in Newport. He was reported as missing from the hospital on 21 February 2015, and was last seen in the early hours of 22 February. After a search, his body was found on 24 February in a field near Cwmbran. Gwent Police treated the death as unexplained. They referred themselves to the Independent Police Complaints Commission because a member of the public had spoken to a police officer about Cecil before his body was found.

At his inquest on 2 March 2015, Gwent Police said that they had found Cecil's body in the field after a call from a member of the public. Preliminary investigations indicated that he had died from hypothermia. The coroner adjourned the inquest for three months, for further investigations to be completed.
