= Owain Jones (cricketer) =

English cricketer

Personal information
- Full name: Owain James Jones
- Born: 24 September 1992 (age 34); Brighton, Sussex, England
- Batting: Left-handed
- Bowling: Right-arm medium

Domestic team information
- Years: Team
- 2012–2013: Oxford MCCU
- 2012–2016: Oxford University

Career statistics
Competition	First-class
Matches	6
Runs scored	349
Batting average	34.90
100s/50s	–/3
Top score	83
Balls bowled	828
Wickets	12
Bowling average	34.00
5 wickets in innings	–
10 wickets in match	–
Best bowling	4/70
Catches/stumpings	2/–
- Source: Cricinfo, 15 May 2020

Owain James Jones (born 24 September 1992) is an English former first-class cricketer.

Jones was born at Brighton in September 1992. He was educated at Steyning Grammar School, before going up to St Edmund Hall, Oxford. While studying at Oxford, he played first-class cricket, making his debut for Oxford MCCU against Worcestershire at Oxford in 2012, with Jones appearing in two further matches for Oxford MCCU in 2013 against Warwickshire and Worcestershire. (Note: Oxford MCCU differed from Oxford University Cricket Club in that it was open to students at Oxford Brookes University, whereas Oxford University Cricket Club is exclusively for students of the constituent colleges of the University of Oxford.) He scored 103 runs for Oxford MCCU, with a high score of 79. In addition to playing for Oxford MCCU, Jones also made three first-class appearances for Oxford University against Cambridge University in The University Matches of 2012, 2015 and 2016. He scored 246 runs at an average of 49.20 in these matches, with a high score of 83. With his right-arm medium pace bowling, he took 10 wickets at a bowling average of 21.80 and best figures of 4 for 70. After graduating from Oxford, he became a schoolmaster at Hurstpierpoint College.
