= Steyning Grammar School =

School in West Sussex, England

- Coat of arms of the School

Location
- Shooting Field; Steyning, West Sussex, BN44 3RX; England; 50°53′36″N 0°19′46″W

Information
- Type: Academy
- Motto: Every Person the Best they Can Be
- Religious affiliation: Church of England
- Established: 1614; 412 years ago
- Founder: William Holland
- Local authority: West Sussex
- Trust: Bohunt Education Trust
- Department for Education URN: 148221 Tables
- Ofsted: Reports
- Chair of Governors: Susan Gearing
- Headteacher: Aidan Timmons (acting)
- Gender: Coeducational
- Age: 11 to 18
- Enrolment: 1,944 pupils
- Campuses: 3
- Colours: Blue and Red
- Alumni: Old Grammarians
- Website: http://www.sgs.uk.net/

Steyning Grammar School is a coeducational comprehensive day and boarding, senior school and sixth form, located in Steyning, West Sussex, England.

The school has two lower school sites catering for Years 7 and 8. The original site was located in Church Street, Steyning, which moved to The Towers in Upper Beeding in August 2022. A second site opened at Rock Road in Storrington in September 2017, on the former site of Rydon Community College. A larger upper school site at Shooting Field, Steyning caters for students in Years 9 to 11 who study the Key Stage 4 curriculum over three years. The school's Sixth Form College for students in Years 12 and 13 is also based at the Shooting Field site. The Shooting Field site is served by Brighton & Hove bus route 2 once a day each weekday morning.

== History ==
Steyning Grammar School, original gate

Steyning Grammar School was founded and endowed as a grammar school in 1614 by William Holland, an Alderman of Chichester. In 1968, it merged with Steyning Secondary Modern School to form the current comprehensive school. The combined school shares two sites in Steyning. The original half-timbered Church Street site housed years 7 and 8 until the end of the 2021-22 academic year after which this age group ('Lower School') transferred to the Towers site in nearby Upper Beeding. The main Shooting Field site houses years 9-11 and the sixth form college. A third lower school site opened in Storrington in September 2017 following the closure of Rydon Community College. Indoor physical education lessons are taught at Steyning Leisure Centre, which a joint project between the school and local councils.

On 11 March 2020, after only two one-hour meetings open to the community, school governors voted to convert the 400-year-old school to an academy as part of the Bohunt Education Trust (BET). A teaching union warned that the school has "nothing to gain and everything to lose" and there was talk of strike action after the plans were announced. Converting Steyning Grammar School into an academy "would give Bohunt complete control over its curriculum and the hiring of teachers".

Bohunt Education Trust (BET) runs nine schools in total, including secondary schools in Worthing and Horsham.

In December 2021 a viral report of a "bleak" Christmas dinner composed of "a mince pie, dry bread roll, slice of turkey, single pig in blanket, and a tiny square of stuffing" went viral, reports indicating the school apologised and the £3.50 cost of the meal was refunded.

In July 2022 Steyning Grammar School was chosen to be part of the Government School Rebuilding Programme and will amalgamate the three school sites into one site at the current Shooting Field site. The project is not expected to be completed until at least 2028 or later.

== Notable alumni ==
- Greg Barker, Baron Barker of Battle, Conservative MP for Bexhill and Battle
- Tom Blundell, head of biochemistry at the University of Cambridge
- Ernest Marshall Cowell, surgeon and military officer
- Richard Du Cann QC, barrister and judge
- Bernard Holden, President of the Bluebell Railway and pioneer in railway preservation
- Owain Jones, cricketer
- Adam Stephen Kelly, award-winning film writer, director and producer
- Ralph Lainson, parasitologist
- Peter Marshall, author and anarchist
- Geoffrey Munn, historian, retired managing director of London jewellers, Wartski, BBC Antiques Roadshow jewellery expert
- Elizabeth Norton, historian
- John Pell, originator of Pell's equation
- Maisie Peters, singer
- Jessica Rosemary Shepherd, botanical artist and botanist
- Connor Swindells, actor
- John Trevett, cricketer
- Ted Walker, poet, author and dramatist
- Lancelot Ware OBE, co-founder of Mensa

== Boarding ==
Steyning Grammar School has a boarding site located at Church Street. It is around half a mile away from the Upper School site in Shooting Field. Steyning is one of a small number of state schools with boarding facilities.

Boarders can join at the beginning of Year 9 and Year 12 to follow GCSE and A-level courses respectively.
