= University of Wales, Newport =

Former university in Wales

- Prifysgol Cymru, Casnewydd
- Coat of Arms of the University of Wales, including the University of Wales, Newport
- Former name: Gwent College of Higher Education
- Type: Public
- Active: 1841–10 April 2013
- Affiliations: Alliance of Non-Aligned Universities; ACU; University of Wales; Campaign for Mainstream Universities
- Students: 9520 (2012)
- Location: Caerleon Campus, Lodge Road, Caerleon, NP18 3QT, Newport, Wales

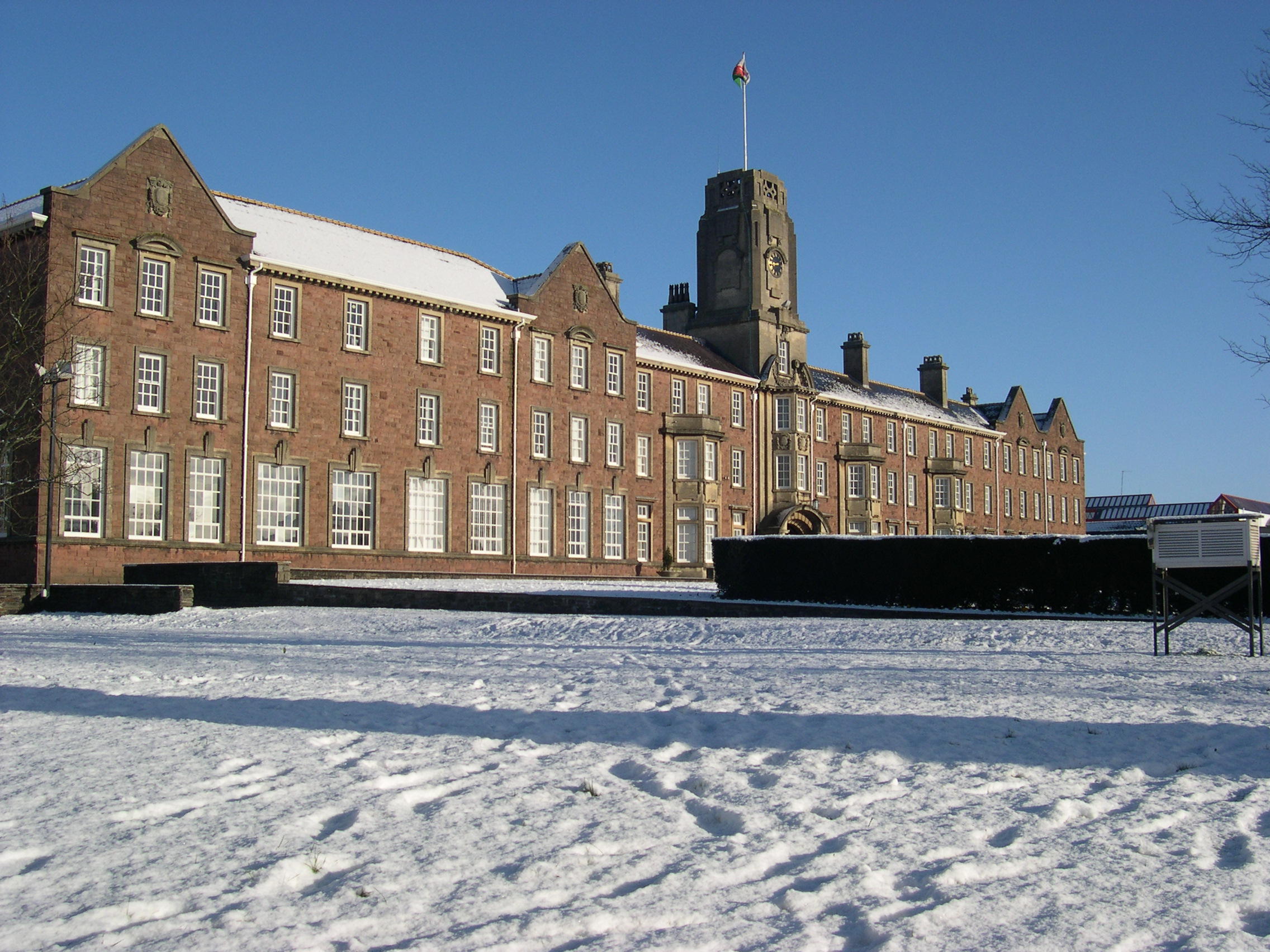
Caerleon campus

The University of Wales, Newport (Welsh: Prifysgol Cymru, Casnewydd), was a public university based in Newport, South Wales, before the merger that formed the University of South Wales in April 2013. The university was founded as a mechanics' institute in 1841 and became an affiliated institution of the University of Wales in 1992. It had two campuses in Newport, Caerleon on the northern outskirts of the city, and a campus on the east bank of the River Usk in Newport city centre.

In 2012 the university was ranked 111th out of 120 UK universities in the Guardian League Table for university rankings, 105th out of 116 in The Complete University Guide and 104th out of 116 UK universities in the Times Good University Guide.

== History ==
Newport had been involved in higher education since 1841. Originally a mechanics' institute, set up to provide further education for workers and tradesmen, it was based in Newport's Town Hall on Commercial Street. Working men and women were able to attend a variety of lectures for two shillings per quarter to study subjects including "The Pursuit of Attainment and Knowledge" and "Popular Superstition".

The institution was later formed as Gwent College of Higher Education by a merger of the Caerleon College of Education (the former Monmouthshire Training College), the Newport College of Art and Design and the Gwent College of Technology in 1975. All three former institutions had established regional and national reputations, most notably the College of Art with many of its students gaining commissions from the BBC and other major organisations in light of the college being among a select number of art colleges in the country awarded Diploma in Art and Design status.

The college became an affiliated institution of the University of Wales in 1992, being admitted as a university college in 1996 where there was a ceremony at which trumpeters of the Prince of Wales's Division played a fanfare from the top of the university clocktower and balloons were released in the faculty colours.

In May 2004, the University of Wales College, Newport secured Privy Council approval to use the title University of Wales, Newport, as a full constituent of the federal university.

On 1 August 2011, the university was restructured, creating two new faculties, each containing three schools:

The Faculty of Arts and Business

- School of Design, Engineering, Fashion and Technology
- School of Film, Photography and Digital Media
- Newport Business School

The Faculty of Education and Social Sciences

- School of Education
- School of Humanities and Lifelong Learning
- School of Sport, Health and Applied Social Sciences

The Centre for Community and Lifelong Learning (CCLL) continued to be based in Tredegar and focused on the university's work to widen participation within the Heads of the Valleys and the wider Gwent region. CCLL was also a key deliverer of the UHOVI (Universities, Heads of the Valleys Institute) project in partnership with the University of Glamorgan and Further Education Colleges.

=== Notable dates ===
- 1841 Opening of Mechanics' Institute, Newport
- 1872 Classes in Art and Science begin under the Free Library Committee
- 1882 New building opened in Dock Street, Newport
- 1886 Teacher training classes begin
- 1891 Newport Technical School opened
- 1898 New premises opened at 24 Bridge Street. Separation of Art Department and Science, Technology & Commerce. Two Heads appointed.
- 1899 Clarence Place land bought from Lord Tredegar
- 1909 Foundation stone laid at Clarence Place
- 1910 Newport Technical Institute opened at Clarence Place
- 1912 Foundation stone laid at Caerleon Training College
- 1915 Schools of Art and Science, Technology and Commerce combined under a single principal
- 1919 Newport Technical Institute renamed "The County Borough of Newport Technical College and Institute"
- 1923 Ordinary National Certificates offered for the first time
- 1934 Name changed to "Newport Technical College"
- 1938 Higher National Certificates offered for the first time
- 1939 – 45 Second World War: college used for troop lectures and evacuees. 19 Caerleon students killed in the war.
- 1940 – 41 Classes run by Ministry of Labour
- 1950 Board of Governors given more power to run Caerleon College of Education
- 1958 Opening of Newport and Monmouthshire College of Technology which later became the Allt-yr-ynn campus. Closure of Newport Technical College. Clarence Place continued as Newport and Monmouthshire College of Art.
- 1962 Female students admitted to Caerleon College of Education for the first time
- 1975 Colleges merge to become "Gwent College of Higher Education". Four new faculties created.
- 1985 New Art and Design building opens at Caerleon campus
- 1987 First degree ceremony is held at Newport.
- 1992 Fire at Caerleon campus
- 1992 GCHE leaves Gwent County Council control.
- 1994 Student Village opens at Caerleon campus
- 1995 GCHE granted taught degree awarding powers
- 1996 GCHE formally changes to University of Wales College, Newport
- 2003 Becomes a full Constituent Institution of the University of Wales and is renamed the University of Wales, Newport.
- 2007 Kegie building opens on the Caerleon campus.
- 2011 Newport City campus opens after a £35 million investment.
- 2011 Allt-yr-ynn campus closes.
- 2012 Vice-chancellor, Peter Noyes, resigns his post and was replaced by Stephen Hagen, who was appointed as Acting Vice-Chancellor, to lead merger talks.
- 2013 Merger with the University of Glamorgan to form the University of South Wales on 11 April 2013.
- 2016 Caerleon campus closes.

=== Proposed merger ===
Along with the University of Glamorgan and Cardiff Metropolitan University, it was proposed by the Welsh Government that the University of Wales, Newport merge to create a single post-92 university in South East Wales.

The plans proved to be highly controversial, with Cardiff Metropolitan opposing any merger, citing the lack of a business case, concerns that the new institution would simply be too big to manage properly, and the 'predatory' attitude of Glamorgan. Newport, however, welcomed the plans, providing they created a genuinely new institution.

Stephen Hagen, appointed Acting Vice-Chancellor by the Newport Board from 1 June 2012 to lead the merger upon the sudden resignation of Peter Noyes, circulated a proposal for the new university to focus on entrepreneurialism, generating start-ups, equipping students with entrepreneurial skills and supporting the industries of South Wales, a concept which was initially well received by the Minister's Office.

In July 2012, Newport and Glamorgan announced talks to create a new University for South Wales, citing the opportunity to: "build on their respective strengths to develop a new, entrepreneurial model of higher education across south Wales". The university was dissolved on 11 April 2013 absorbed into University of Glamorgan and renamed University of South Wales.

In response to Cardiff Metropolitan's opposition to its involvement in any merger plans, Leighton Andrews (a strong proponent of mergers) threatened to forcibly dissolve Cardiff Metropolitan and hand its assets over to the new university formed by Glamorgan. Cardiff Metropolitan still demanded more evidence before committing to further talks and, in November 2012, Leighton Andrews withdrew a consultation on plans to force a merger.

== Campuses ==
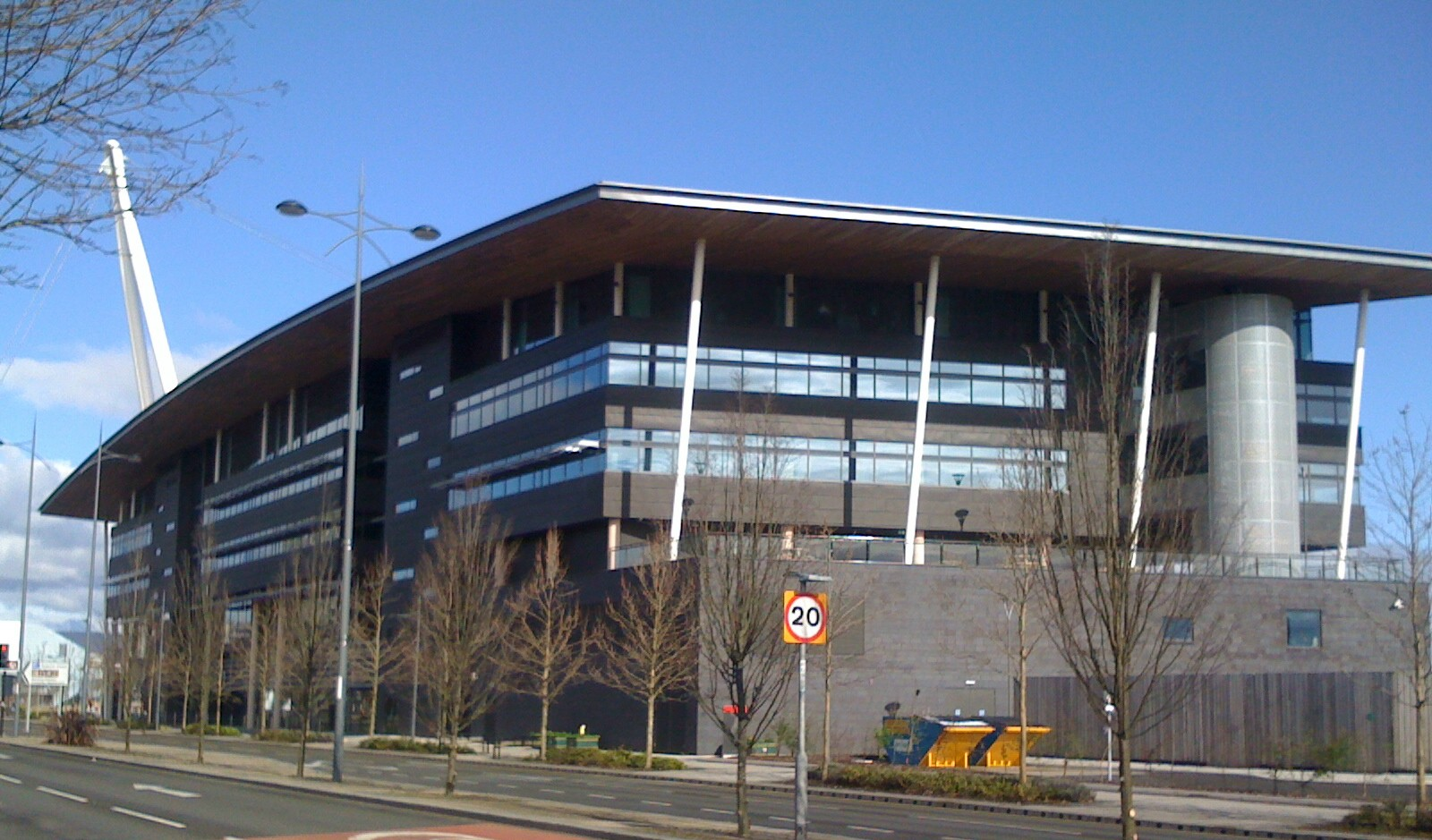
Newport city centre campus

The university opened a new £35 million campus in Newport's city centre formally on 10 January 2011. The project was a collaboration between the university, Newport City Council and the Welsh Assembly Government operating through Newport Unlimited, the urban regeneration company for the city.

The campus is situated on the western side of the River Usk in the city centre and it was the first phase of an intended £50m development for the university. It housed the Faculty of Arts and Business whilst the Caerleon campus housed the Faculty of Education and Social Sciences. The campus was part of a major redevelopment of Newport city centre. The old city campus at Allt-yr-yn was closed and demolished.

== Reputation ==
The university had been involved in higher education since 1841. In 2009, it was rated the number one university in Wales for enterprise education by the Knowledge Exploitation Fund.

The School of Film, Photography and Digital Media taught a documentary photography degree programme as well as housing the Newport Film School, founded by John Grierson in 1966 and producing many award-winning film-makers since then.

The 2010 CILECT Congress (the international association for film and television schools) unanimously voted in Newport Film School as a full member – only two of the ten new applicant schools for full membership were given this accolade.

== Students' Union ==
Newport Students' Union was the students' union representing all students at the university. The union was run day-to-day by a team of sabbatical officers. Alongside this sabbatical team, full-time and part-time staff were employed to assist in the operation of the union and part-time officers, team captains, society presidents and student managers who all worked alongside their studies to assist the union.

Newport Students' Union provided a range of sports teams, societies and entertainment for students to get involved in. The union also housed a newspaper (NewsPort), magazine (newtwo), TV station (NTV) and radio station (Radio Noize). As well as weekly social events and club nights, the union organised Freshers' Fortnight, Freshers' Fayre, Re: Freshers Week, RAG (Raising and Giving Week) and the May Ball.

== Notable alumni ==
(View University of South Wales for further alumni )

- Christopher Chung Shu-kun, a member of Hong Kong Legislative Council
- Roger Cecil, artist
- Ken Elias, artist
- Green Gartside, the frontman of the band Scritti Politti
- Harry Greene, television personality
- Paul Groves, poet
- Philip John, director and screenwriter
- Kirk Jones, director
- Natasha Rhodes, science fiction author
- Asif Kapadia, film director
- Scott Barley, filmmaker and artist
- Justin Kerrigan, writer and film director
- Tracey Moberly, artist, author and radio presenter
- Ian Watkins, former singer in the rock band Lostprophets; convicted sex offender

== See also ==
- Newport Technical Institute, the landmark former Newport Art College building
