= Caerleon campus =

Grade II listed former university campus in Caerleon, Wales

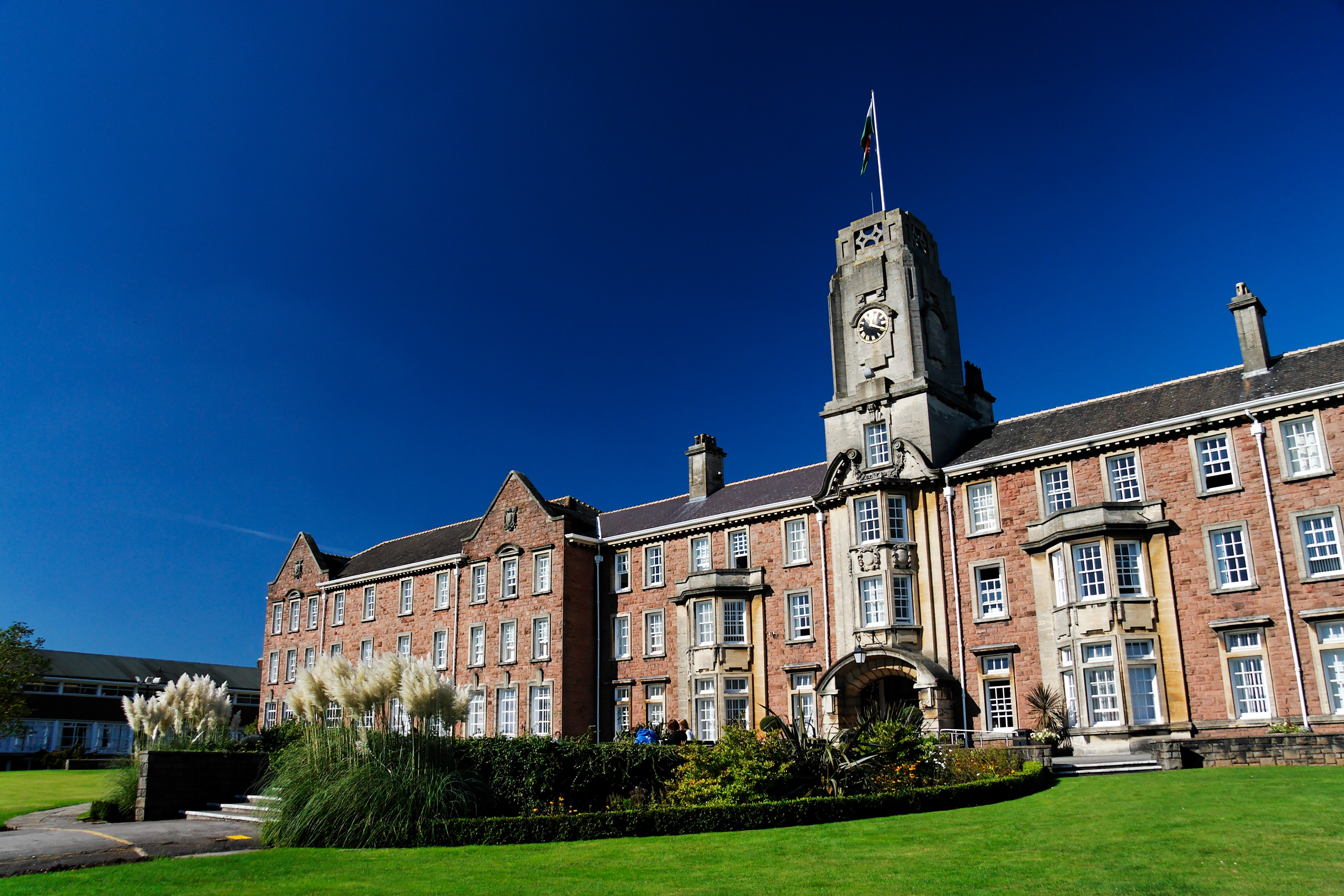

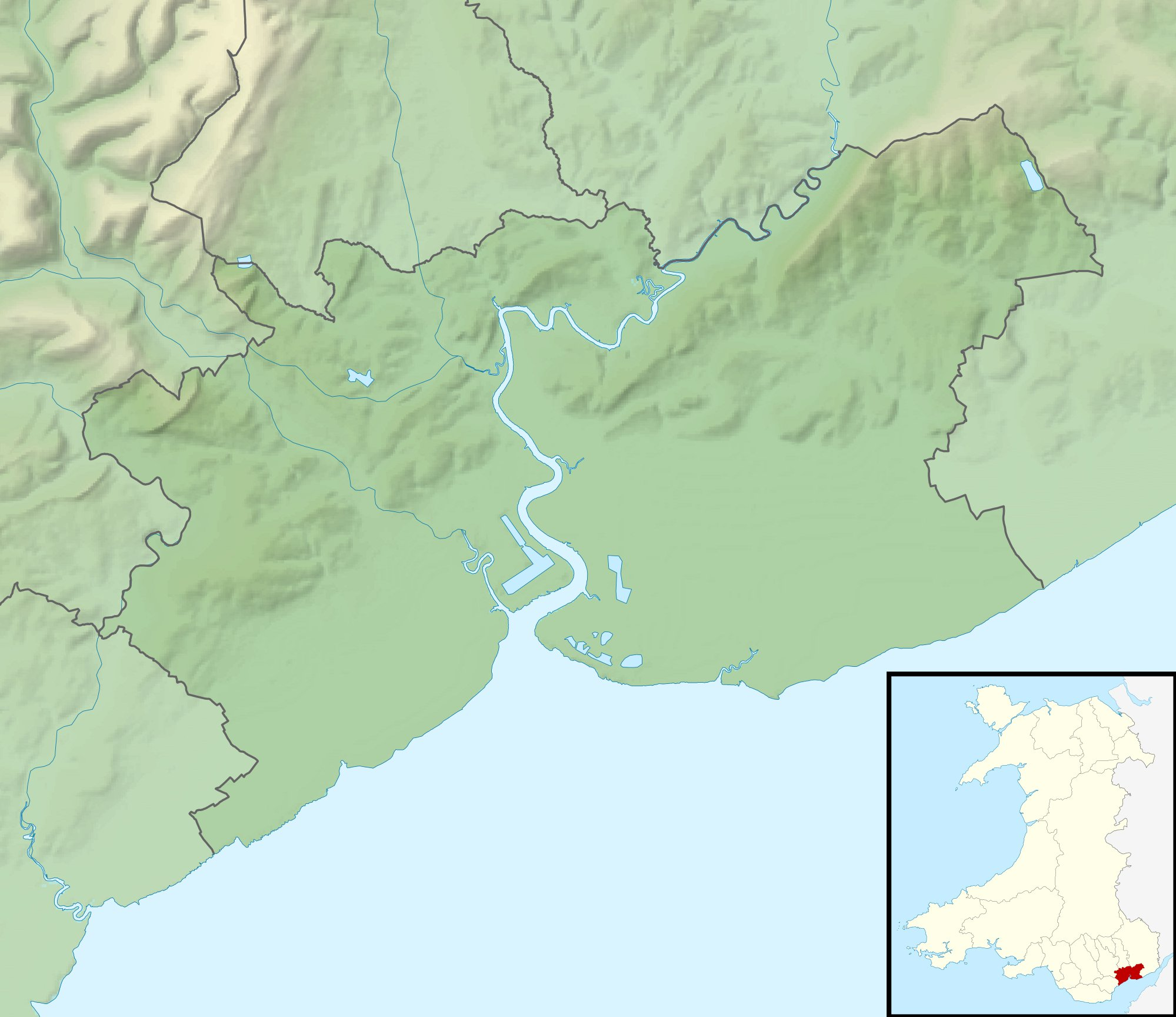
- Location within Newport
- 51.6166°N 2.9618°W
- Type: University campus
- Location: Caerleon, Newport, Wales

History
- Built: 1912–1914 with later additions

Site notes
- Architect(s): Alfred Swash & Son
- Architectural style: Edwardian Revival
- Owner: Private

Listed Building – Grade II
- Official name: Former Caerleon Teacher Training College Building
- Designated: 2 March 2017
- Reference no.: 87729

Listed Building – Grade II
- Official name: Principal's residence at the University of South Wales, Caerleon Campus
- Designated: 2 March 2017
- Reference no.: 87726

Listed Building – Grade II
- Official name: Caretaker's/Gardener's lodge at the University of South Wales, Caerleon Campus
- Designated: 2 March 2017
- Reference no.: 87727

Listed Building – Grade II
- Official name: Gate piers at the University of South Wales, Caerleon Campus
- Designated: 2 March 2017
- Reference no.: 87728

Caerleon campus stands near Lodge Hill, a ridge to the north of the town of Caerleon, on the outskirts of Newport, Wales. The site opened as a teacher training college in 1914. In the 1975 the campus became the principal campus of the Gwent College of Higher Education, which changed its name to the University of Wales College, Newport in 1996 and then became the University of Wales, Newport in 2003. On further merger in 2013, it became part of the University of South Wales. In 2014 the university announced plans to close the campus at the end of the 2015/16 academic year and sell the site for redevelopment. To prevent demolition, the Welsh Government recommended the listing of certain buildings on the site, which was carried out by Cadw, the Welsh historic environment agency, in 2017. The main block and three ancillary buildings are now listed at Grade II. The sale of the site went ahead, and residential redevelopment was in progress at the end of 2024. The site was used for the filming of the Netflix television series Sex Education between 2019 and 2023 when it represented Moordale Secondary School.

== History ==
The impetus for the establishment of the Caerleon campus came from the 1902 Education Act which abolished the existing School boards in England and Wales, replacing them with local education authorities administered by the county councils. In 1908 Monmouthshire County Council, (Note: At the time Caerleon was in the county of Monmouthshire but was transferred to the county borough of Newport in 1996.) following discussion with neighboring authorities, proposed the establishment of two teacher training colleges, one in Barry for the training of female students, and one at Caerleon for the training of male students. The Caerleon campus site was purchased and in 1912 the foundation stone for the college was laid by Reginald McKenna, MP for North Monmouthshire and home secretary in the Liberal Government of the time.

The architects for the new campus were Swash & Son of Newport. Alfred Swash (1860–1939), trained as an architect in the firm of Habershon, Pite and Fawckner, establishing his own practice in 1888. In 1908 he was joined by his son, Frank Stanley. Alfred served as mayor of Newport in 1916–17. Frank Stanley (1885–1965) continued in practice after his father's death, retiring to Poole in Dorset where he died in 1965.

The campus was subsequently renamed Caerleon College of Education, before merging with the Newport College of Art and Design and the Gwent College of Technology in 1975 to become the Gwent College of Higher Education. Further mergers saw academic control move to the University of Wales, Newport in 2004 and to the University of South Wales in 2013. The following year the university announced its intention to close the Caerleon campus and to sell the site, effective from the autumn of 2016. The campus was subsequently bought by Barratt Redrow for residential development. The university and the developers favoured the clearing of the site through demolition but, following a local campaign and political pressure, the main block and three ancillary buildings were protected through listed building status issued by Cadw in 2017. The site was sold on to Acorn Property in 2023 and development work on the estate, renamed Parc Y Coleg, continues as at January 2025.

Between 2019 and 2023 the campus was used as a principal filming location for the Netflix television series Sex Education, when it represented Moordale Secondary School.

== Architecture and description ==
The main block at Caerleon campus is of three storeys with a central clock tower. The construction material is Old Red Sandstone with Bath stone ashlar dressings. Cadw describes the architectural style as "mixed Revival". Swash & Son's original plans were for a more elaborate building than was eventually constructed, with a larger central tower and more decoration in the stonework. John Newman, in his Gwent/Monmouthshire volume in the Buildings of Wales series, describes the thirty-one-bay façade as "enormously long". To either side of the main block are two pavilions, originally serving as the principal's and caretaker's houses. The principal's house was to a grander design than the porter's lodge. Both were designed to frame, and conceal, the main façade until it could be viewed at close quarters. Entrance to the site is through a pair of gatepiers which flank a long drive.

The college main block, the former principal's house, the caretaker's lodge and the gatepiers at the entrance to the site are all Grade II listed buildings. John Newman considered two later-20th century additions to be of particular interest; the Faculty of Art and Design, "a spectacular cascade of steel and glass", of 1982, and the Rathmell Building, "a huge, metal-clad asymmetrical curve", of 1995–97. (Note: John Newman suggested that the Gwent County Council architects of the Art and Design Faculty were influenced by the contemporaneous Inmos microprocessor factory at Newport designed by Richard Rogers.) Neither structure was listed by Cadw and both were demolished after 2016.

== Sources ==
- Newman, John (2000). Gwent/Monmouthshire. The Buildings of Wales. London: Penguin Books. ISBN 978-0-300-09630-9.
