= Anthony Lexa =

British actress

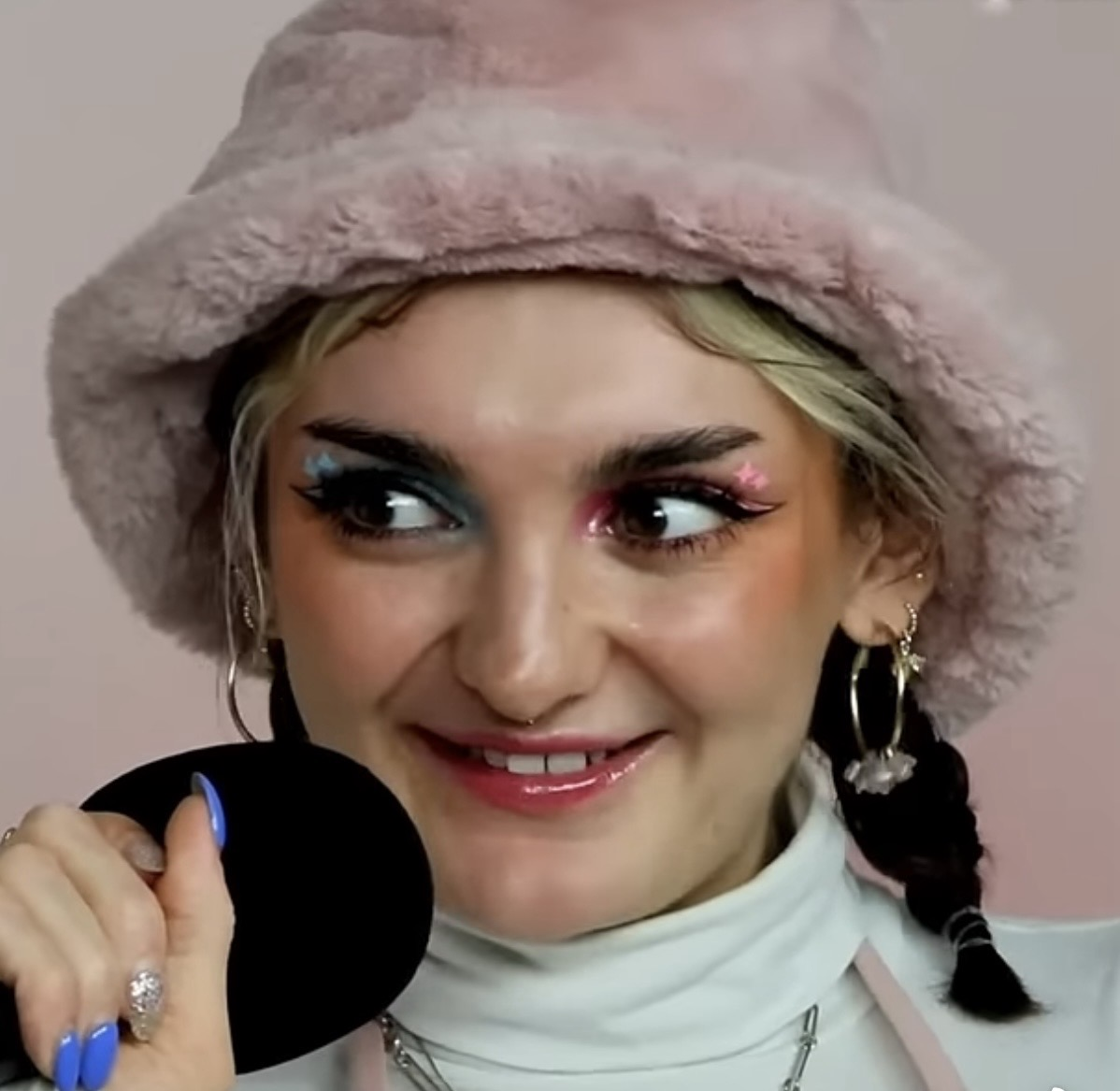
- Lexa in 2025
- Born: 2000 (age 25–26)
- Occupations: Actress, musician
- Years active: 2023–present

Anthony Lexa (born 2000) is a British actress and singer-songwriter. She is known for her role as Abbi Montgomery in the British teen sex comedy-drama television series Sex Education.

== Career ==
Lexa is a songwriter and singer, making and performing indie pop music. She released her single Early Nights in September 2023.

As a stage actress, she appeared in productions at London's West End theatre.

Lexa portrayed Abbi Montgomery in the British teen sex comedy-drama television series Sex Education. Her Sex Education character is a transgender Christian girl and queen bee at Cavendish Sixth Form College, who was kicked out of her family home. Lexa was recruited for the role through an open casting call. Lexa performed in the show's first transgender sex scene.

== Personal life ==
Lexa was born in 2000. She grew up in rural Devon, and moved to London in 2021. She is based in London.

She is a transgender woman. She is a supporter of Trans Secret Santa, which is a charity run by Think2Speak that supports transgender people at Christmas time.

== Discography ==
=== Extended plays ===
Title	EP details
T Time	Released: 20 October 2023; Label: Self-released; Format: Digital download, streaming

==== Singles ====
Single	Year
"Movin On Up"	2019
"Ingredients"	2019
"Noise"	2019
"Early Nights"	2023
"Sleepy"	2023
"Terrified"	2024
"Midnight" (with Bugwell and Nathan X)	2025
