= John Trevett =

English cricketer (1942–2019)

Personal information
- Full name: John Charles Pullman Trevett
- Born: 30 July 1942; Woking, Surrey, England
- Died: 29 April 2019 (aged 76); Brighton, Sussex, England
- Batting: Right-handed
- Bowling: Slow left-arm orthodox

Domestic team information
- Years: Team
- 1962: Oxford University

Career statistics
Competition	First-class
Matches	2
Runs scored	1
Batting average	0.50
100s/50s	–/–
Top score	1
Balls bowled	168
Wickets	0
Bowling average	–
5 wickets in innings	–
10 wickets in match	–
Best bowling	–
Catches/stumpings	–/–
- Source: Cricinfo, 5 April 2020

John Charles Pullman Trevett (30 July 1942 – 29 April 2019) was an English first-class cricketer.

Trevett was born at Woking in July 1942. He was educated at Steyning Grammar School, before going up to Wadham College, Oxford. While studying at Oxford, he made two appearances in first-class cricket for Oxford University against Lancashire and Middlesex at Oxford in 1962. Trevett died at Brighton in April 2019.
