= Kedar Williams-Stirling =

English actor

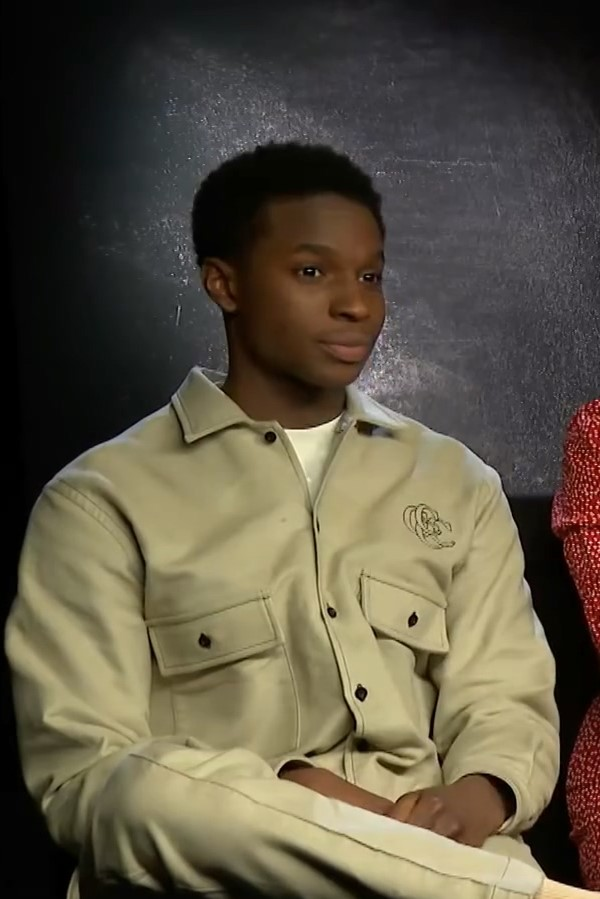
- Williams-Stirling in 2019
- Born: 14 December 1994 (age 31); Plaistow, London, England
- Education: Italia Conti Academy of Theatre Arts
- Occupation: Actor
- Years active: 2007–present

Kedar Williams-Stirling (/ˈkiːdər/; born 14 December 1994) is an English actor. His film roles include the action dramas Shank (2010) and Montana (2014). On television, he has appeared as a series regular on the CBBC teen fantasy Wolfblood (2012–2014) and the Netflix comedy-drama Sex Education (2019–2023).

== Early life and education ==
Williams-Stirling was born in Plaistow, Newham in east London. He later moved to South London. He began acting in primary school plays. His mother encouraged him to audition for Sylvia Young Theatre School when he was in Year 6. He also trained at Barbara Speake Stage School and later the Italia Conti Academy of Theatre Arts.

== Career ==
Williams-Stirling appeared in British films such as Shank and Montana. He also starred in the CBBC television series Wolfblood.

In May 2018, it was announced that Williams-Stirling would star alongside Gillian Anderson and Asa Butterfield in the Netflix original comedy-drama series Sex Education. The series was released on 11 January 2019, to critical acclaim.

== Personal life ==
Williams-Stirling is a supporter of Arsenal F.C.

== Filmography ==
=== Film ===
Year	Title	Role	Notes
2010	Shank	Junior	
2011	Drink, Drugs and KFC	Nathan	Short film
2013	You Are Me	Dan	Short film
2014	Montana	Lorenzo	
2016	Elderflower	Tony	Short film
2018	Two Graves	Barry	
2019	Changeland	Marc	

=== Television ===
Year	Title	Role	Notes
2007	The Bill	Adie Mazvidza	Episode: "Back from the Dead"
2008	Silent Witness	Levi Harris	Episodes: "Safe: Part 1", "Safe: Part 2"
2009	Doctors	Richard Cole	Episode: "Art of War"
2012–2014	Wolfblood	Tom Okanawe	Main Role (Series 1–3)
2013	School for Stars	Himself (Student)	Series documentary; Episode: "Episode #3.1"
2014	Officially Amazing	Himself	Episode #3.2
2015	Ultimate Brain	Himself (Contestant)	Episode #1.6
2016	Roots	Sitafa	Miniseries, Episode: "Part 1"
2017	Death in Paradise	Torey Martin	Episode: "Stumped in Murder"
2017	Will	Owen	6 episodes
2019–2023	Sex Education	Jackson Marchetti	Series regular; 32 episodes
2020	Small Axe	Clifton	Episode: "Lovers Rock"

=== Stage ===
Year	Title	Role	Venue(s)/Production(s)
2006	The Lion King	Young Simba	Lyceum Theatre, London
2010	Welcome to Thebes	Scud	
2015	The History Boys	Dakin	UK Tour
2022-2024	Red Pitch	Bilal	2022-2023: Bush Theatre; 2024: @sohoplace
2025	Thanks for Having Me	Honey	Riverside Studios
2026	One Flew Over the Cuckoo's Nest	Billy Bibbit	The Old Vic
