= Connor Swindells =

English actor and model (born 1996)

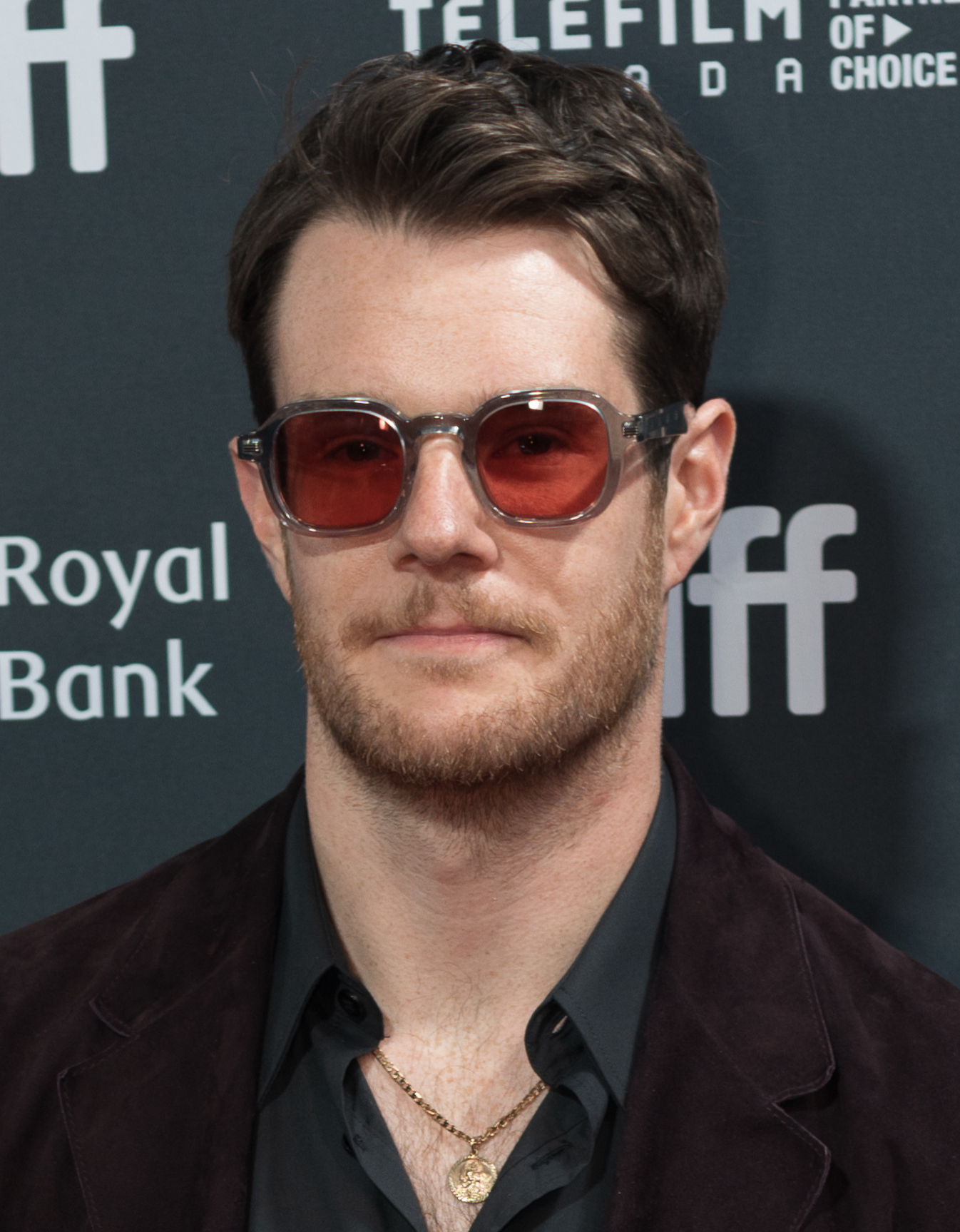
- Swindells in 2024
- Born: Connor Ryan Swindells; 19 September 1996 (age 29); Lewes, East Sussex, England
- Occupations: Actor; model
- Years active: 2015–present
- Spouse: Amber Anderson (m. 2024)

Connor Ryan Swindells (born 19 September 1996) is an English actor and model. Starting his career in 2015, he made his film debut in 2018 and gained recognition for his role as Adam Groff in the Netflix comedy drama series Sex Education (2019–2023). He next starred in the BBC One war drama SAS: Rogue Heroes (2022–present), and in the films Emma (2020), Barbarians (2021), Barbie (2023), and Jingle Bell Heist (2025).

== Early life and education ==
Connor Ryan Swindells was born in Lewes, East Sussex, the youngest of four boys for parents Ian and Phoebe. His mother, of Romani descent, died of bowel cancer when Swindells was seven years old, which he has said he is still processing. After her death, he and his father went to live with Swindells' paternal grandparents in West Chiltington until moving out to Billingshurst, both in the Horsham District of West Sussex.

Swindells attended Rydon Community College and Steyning Grammar School. He dropped out of college at age 17.

== Career ==
Swindells began acting when he saw an audition poster for a local play and his friend dared him to audition; he got the lead role. He then acted in two more local plays and signed with an agent at the end of the third play.

In 2017 Swindells made his television debut with guest appearances as Mostyn in the Hulu period drama Harlots (2017), and as Fletcher in the Sky One historical drama Jamestown.

In March 2017, Swindells was cast to replace Joe Alwyn as Donald in The Vanishing, a Scottish psychological thriller film directed by Kristoffer Nyholm, co-starring Gerard Butler and Peter Mullan. The film screened at the 2018 Sitges Film Festival before having a theatrical release on 4 January 2019. Swindells also starred as Adam in the 2018 drama film VS.

In 2019 Swindells began starring as Adam Groff, the headmaster's son, alongside Ncuti Gatwa, Emma Mackey, Asa Butterfield, and Gillian Anderson in the Netflix comedy-drama series Sex Education (2019–2023).

Swindells appeared in the films Emma (2020), and Barbarians (2021), and played Simon Hadlow in the 2021 BBC One crime drama Vigil, led by Suranne Jones. The following year, he began starring in the lead role of David Stirling in the World War II BBC One series SAS: Rogue Heroes.

Swindells appeared in Greta Gerwig's Barbie, reuniting with his Sex Education co-stars Ncuti Gatwa and Emma Mackey.

In 2024, he played Jae Donnelly in the Netflix film Scoop (2024). Later that year he portrayed Gessler in the film William Tell (2024).

In 2025, he played DS Ed McCusker in the Lockerbie based miniseries The Bombing of Pan Am 103.

== Personal life ==
Swindells has been married to the actress Amber Anderson since 2024. They married in the Scottish Highlands. Their wedding was officiated by Alistair Petrie, who plays Swindells' father in Sex Education.

== Filmography ==
Key
| † | Denotes works that have not yet been released |

=== Film ===
| Year | Title | Role | Notes |
|---|---|---|---|
| 2018 | VS. | Adam | |
| 2019 | The Vanishing | Donald McArthur | |
| 2020 | Emma | Robert Martin | |
| 2021 | Barbarians | Dan | |
| 2023 | Barbie | Aaron Dinkins | |
| 2024 | Scoop | Jae Donnelly | |
| 2024 | William Tell | Albercht Gessler | |
| 2025 | Jingle Bell Heist | Nick O'Connor | |
| TBA | The Entertainment System Is Down † | TBA | Post-production |

=== Television ===
| Year | Title | Role | Notes |
|---|---|---|---|
| 2017 | Harlots | Mostyn | Episode #1.3 |
| 2017 | Jamestown | Fletcher | Episode #1.5 |
| 2019–2023 | Sex Education | Adam Groff | Main role; 30 episodes |
| 2021 | Vigil | Lieutenant Simon Hadlow | Miniseries |
| 2021 | Dodo | Jamie Connoly | Recurring role; 5 episodes |
| 2022–present | SAS: Rogue Heroes | David Stirling | Main role |
| 2024 | The Completely Made-Up Adventures of Dick Turpin | Tommy Silversides | |
| 2025 | The Bombing of Pan Am 103 | DS Ed McCusker | Main role. Miniseries |
| TBA | The Dream Lands † | Kole | Filming |

== Awards and nominations ==
| Year | Award | Category | Work | Result | Ref. |
|---|---|---|---|---|---|
| 2017 | Screen International | Stars of Tomorrow | Himself | Inducted | |
| 2019 | MTV Movie Awards | Best Kiss (with Ncuti Gatwa) | Sex Education | Nominated | |
| 2022 | Series Em Cena Awards | Best Comedy Star | Sex Education | Nominated | |
| 2023 | Broadcasting Press Guild Awards | Best Actor | SAS: Rogue Heroes | Nominated | |
