= Patricia Allison =

English actress

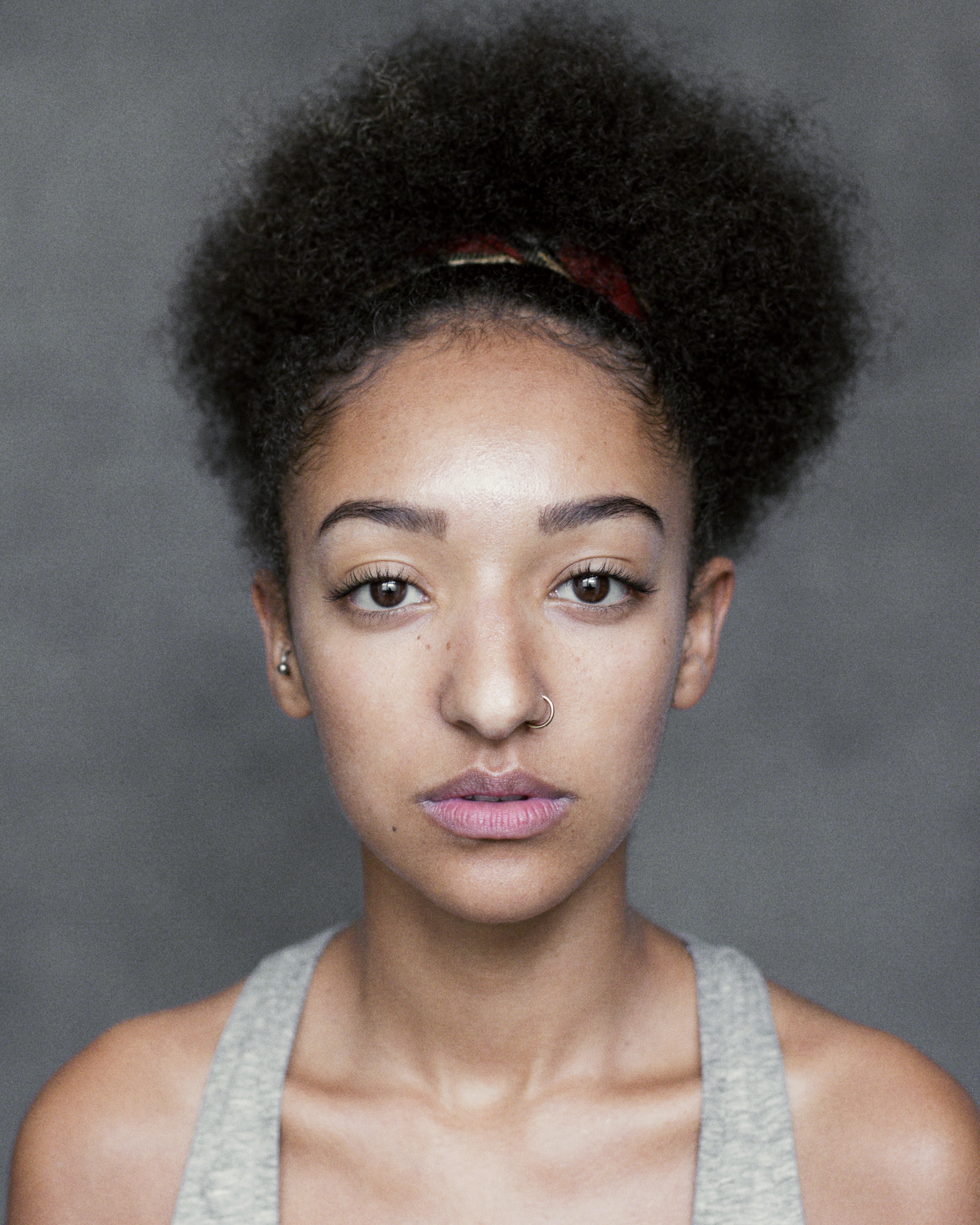
- Allison in 2017
- Born: 7 December 1994 (age 31); London, England, UK
- Other name: Trish Allison
- Education: Colchester Institute; East 15 Acting School (BA)
- Occupation: Actress
- Years active: 2018–present
- Television: Sex Education

Patricia Allison (born 7 December 1994) is an English actress. Following a string of guest appearances on television, she landed her first major role as Ola Nyman on the Netflix comedy-drama series Sex Education (2019–2021).

== Early life ==
At the age of ten, she appeared in a production of Oliver Twist at the Royal Opera House. After leaving school, she studied musical theatre for two years at the Colchester Institute, followed by a four-year course at the East 15 Acting School in Loughton, Essex where she graduated with a Bachelor of Arts in Acting.

== Career ==
In 2018, Allison played a minor role as Marguerite in the BBC miniseries Les Misérables, before being introduced as Ola Nyman in the Netflix comedy-drama series Sex Education in 2019. In 2020, her role was promoted to a main character. However, she did not return to the series for its fourth season, aired in 2023.

== Filmography ==
=== Film ===
Year	Title	Role
2021	Tiny Cow	Ronnie
2021	Superworm	Butterfly (voice)

=== Television ===
Year	Title	Role	Notes
2018	Les Misérables	Marguerite	Episode 1.2
2019	Moving On	Charlie	Episode: "A Walk in my Shoes"
2019	Thanks for the Memories	Claudia	Episode 1.2
2020	Unprecedented	Ellie	In House Party by April De Angelis
2020	Behind the Filter	Charlotte	Pilot
2019–2021	Sex Education	Ola Nyman	Main role, 14 episodes
2022	His Dark Materials	Kirjava (voice)	2 episodes
2023	Extraordinary	Hannah	1 episode
2025	Death in Paradise	Carrie Standish	1 episode
