= Peter Noyes (academic administrator) =

British academic

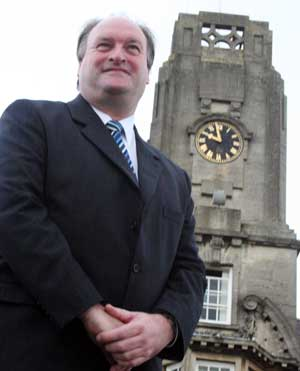
Peter Noyes

Peter Noyes is an academic who was the Vice-Chancellor of University of Wales, Newport in Newport, South Wales, UK, 2006–2012.

Noyes has a degree in social psychology from Loughborough University and a Ph.D. in educational psychology from the University of London. Noyes joined the University of Wales administrative staff in 1996, after previously working at the Cheltenham & Gloucester College of Higher Education; he was appointed as vice-chancellor in 2006. On 8 May 2012 he issued a statement that he would be stepping down from his post at the end of the academic year for "personal reasons".
