= Sex Education (TV series) =

British comedy-drama television series (2019–2023)

- Genre: Comedy drama; Sex comedy; Teen drama
- Created by: Laurie Nunn
- Starring: Asa Butterfield; Gillian Anderson; Ncuti Gatwa; Emma Mackey; Connor Swindells; Kedar Williams-Stirling; Alistair Petrie; Mimi Keene; Aimee Lou Wood; Chaneil Kular; Simone Ashley; Tanya Reynolds; Patricia Allison; Mikael Persbrandt; Anne-Marie Duff; James Purefoy; Rakhee Thakrar; Jemima Kirke
- Music by: Matt Biffa; Ciara Elwis; Ruby Wasmuth; Fiona Cruickshank; Sam Thompson
- Composers: Oli Julian; Ezra Furman
- Country of origin: United Kingdom
- Original language: English
- No. of series: 4
- No. of episodes: 32

Production
- Executive producers: Jamie Campbell; Ben Taylor; Laurie Nunn; Clare Couchman (series 4)
- Producers: Byron Archard; Jon Jennings
- Cinematography: Jamie Cairney; Oli Russell
- Editors: Steve Ackroyd; David Webb; Calum Ross
- Running time: 46–83 minutes
- Production company: Eleven Film

Original release
- Network: Netflix
- Release: 11 January 2019 – 21 September 2023

Sex Education is a British teen sex comedy drama television series created by Laurie Nunn for Netflix. It follows the lives of the teenagers and adults in the fictional town of Moordale as they contend with various personal dilemmas, often related to sexual intimacy. It stars an ensemble cast that includes Asa Butterfield, Gillian Anderson, Ncuti Gatwa, Emma Mackey, Connor Swindells, Kedar Williams-Stirling, Alistair Petrie, Mimi Keene, and Aimee Lou Wood.

The first series was released on Netflix on 11 January 2019. The second, third and fourth series followed in January 2020, September 2021 and September 2023, respectively. Sex Education has received critical acclaim for its performances, writing, directing, production value, and mature treatment of its themes. The programme has been a viewership success, with over 40 million viewers streaming the first series after its debut. Wood won the BAFTA TV Award for Best Female Comedy Performance for her role in the second series, and the third series won Best Comedy Series at the 50th International Emmy Awards.

== Premise ==
Sex Education primarily follows Otis Milburn, a student at Moordale Secondary School. Otis begins the series ambivalent about sex, in part because his single mother, Jean Milburn, is a sex therapist who frequently has affairs with male suitors but does not maintain romantic relationships.

Other students at Moordale Secondary include Eric Effiong, Otis's best friend and the gay son of Ghanaian-Nigerian immigrants; Maeve Wiley, an intelligent and rebellious teen with a troubled family past; Adam Groff, headmaster Michael Groff's son who develops a bullying nature out of his own self-loathing; Jackson Marchetti, the head boy struggling to meet the high expectations set for him; Ruby Matthews, Anwar Bakshi, and Olivia Hanan, members of a popular clique known as "the Untouchables"; Aimee Gibbs, an Untouchable who secretly befriends Maeve; and Lily Iglehart, a writer of alien erotica determined to lose her virginity. The school is soon joined by Ola Nyman, whose widowed father, Jakob Nyman, begins a relationship with Jean. Otis's father, womaniser Remi Milburn, and Maeve's mother, drug addict Erin Wiley, later return to Moordale to reconnect with their children.

=== Plot outline ===
In the first series, Otis sets up a sex therapy clinic with Maeve to help the students of Moordale Secondary with their sexual problems. Their business becomes a success, but tension arises when Otis finds himself becoming attracted to Maeve.

In the second series, new students arrive at Moordale Secondary, including Ola, who becomes Otis's first girlfriend. Maeve struggles to confess her feelings for Otis, Eric helps his former bully Adam come to terms with his sexuality, and Jean becomes the school's resident sex therapist as a chlamydia outbreak highlights the teens' need for better sex education.

In the third series, a new school year begins as Otis is having casual sex with Ruby while Eric and Adam are made official. Maeve works with English teacher Emily Sands to apply for an exchange program in America, Jean expects a baby in the near future, and new headmistress Hope Haddon's plans to revamp Moordale Secondary creates conflict with the students.

In the fourth series, the students adjust to the new term at Cavendish Sixth Form College after Moordale Secondary is shut down. Otis competes with a rival sex therapist on campus while juggling his long-distance relationship with Maeve, who begins her studies at the prestigious Wallace University in the United States.

== Cast and characters ==
=== Main ===
- Asa Butterfield as Otis Milburn, a socially awkward teenager who gives sex advice to his peers
- Gillian Anderson as Jean Milburn, Otis's mother and a well-known sex therapist
- Ncuti Gatwa as Eric Effiong, Otis's openly gay best friend who comes from a religious Ghanaian-Nigerian family
- Emma Mackey as Maeve Wiley, an intelligent but troubled teenager who runs a sex therapy clinic with Otis
- Connor Swindells as Adam Groff, the headmaster's son and Eric's bully-turned-love interest
- Kedar Williams-Stirling as Jackson Marchetti, the head boy at Moordale Secondary School and a swimming champion
- Alistair Petrie as Michael Groff, the headmaster of Moordale Secondary School and Adam's strict father
- Mimi Keene as Ruby Matthews, a popular girl at Moordale Secondary School and the leader of the Untouchables clique
- Aimee Lou Wood as Aimee Gibbs, a former member of the Untouchables who becomes friends with Maeve
- Chaneil Kular as Anwar Bakshi (series 1–3), a member of the Untouchables
- Simone Ashley as Olivia Hanan (series 1–3), a member of the Untouchables
- Tanya Reynolds as Lily Iglehart (series 1–3), a girl who writes alien erotica
- Patricia Allison as Ola Nyman (series 1–3), a pansexual girl who joins Moordale Secondary School
- Mikael Persbrandt as Jakob Nyman (series 1–3), Ola's father and a widowed Swedish plumber who develops a relationship with Jean
- Anne-Marie Duff as Erin Wiley (series 2–3), a drug addict and the absent mother of Maeve, Sean and Elsie
- James Purefoy as Remi Milburn (series 2; guest series 1), Otis's father and Jean's ex-husband, a therapist and sex addict who lives in America
- Rakhee Thakrar as Emily Sands (series 3; recurring series 1–2; guest series 4), an English teacher at Moordale Secondary School
- Jemima Kirke as Hope Haddon (series 3), the new headmistress at Moordale Secondary School and Michael Groff's replacement

=== Recurring ===
- Jim Howick as Colin Hendricks (series 1–3; guest series 4), a science teacher at Moordale Secondary School who conducts the Swing Band
- Samantha Spiro as Maureen Groff, the headmaster's wife and Adam's mother
- Hannah Waddingham as Sofia Marchetti (series 1–2 and 4; guest series 3), one of Jackson's mothers
- Sharon Duncan-Brewster as Roz Marchetti (series 1–2 and 4), Jackson's other mother
- DeObia Oparei as Abeo Effiong (series 1), Eric's concerned and protective father
- Doreene Blackstock as Beatrice Effiong, Eric's supportive mother
- Chris Jenks as Steve Morley (series 1–3), a student at Moordale Secondary School, who becomes Aimee's boyfriend
- Lisa Palfrey as Cynthia (series 1–3), the owner of the caravan park where Maeve lives
- Daniel Ings as Dan (series 1, 3–4), Joy's real father
- Joe Wilkinson as Jeffrey, Cynthia's husband
- Jojo Macari as Kyle (series 1; guest series 2–3), one of Aimee's ex-boyfriends
- Edward Bluemel as Sean Wiley (series 1 and 4), Maeve's absent older brother who raised her instead of their parents
- Chinenye Ezeudu as Vivienne 'Viv' Odusanya (series 2–4), a girl who tutors Jackson and is a member of the quiz team
- George Robinson as Isaac Goodwin (series 2–4), a disabled boy who lives on the same campsite as Maeve
- George Somner as Joe Goodwin (series 2–4), Isaac's brother and carer who lives on Maeve's campsite
- Conor Clarke McGrath as Connor Pearson (series 2–4), a student at Moordale Secondary School
- Sami Outalbali as Rahim Harrack (series 2–3), a French exchange student who shows an interest in Eric
- Lino Facioli as Dex Thompson (series 2–3), a member of the quiz team
- Mirren Mack as Florence (series 2), an asexual student at Moordale Secondary School
- George Georgiou as Yousef (series 2), the owner of the local shop and Rahim's uncle
- Armin Karima as Malek Amir (series 2–3), Olivia Hanan's boyfriend
- Conor Donovan as Quentin (series 2–3), a member of the drama club and enemy of Mr Hendricks
- Jason Isaacs as Peter Groff (series 3), older brother of Michael Groff
- Indra Ové as Anna (series 3, guest series 4), foster mother of Maeve's younger half-sister Elsie
- Dua Saleh as Cal Bowman (series 3–4), a non-binary student at Moordale Secondary School who relocated from Minneapolis
- Robyn Holdaway as Layla (series 3), a non-binary student at Moordale Secondary School
- Dan Levy as Mr Molloy (series 4), a teacher in the study program Maeve attends in the United States
- Hannah Gadsby as Celia (series 4), a manager at the radio station where Jean works
- Thaddea Graham as Sarah "O" Owens (series 4), a rival sex therapist student at Cavendish College
- Anthony Lexa as Abbi Montgomery (series 4), a popular girl and the leader of Cavendish College's The Coven clique
- Alexandra James as Aisha Green (series 4), a member of The Coven who is partially deaf
- Felix Mufti as Roman Zardari (series 4), a member of The Coven and Abbi's boyfriend
- Reda Elazouar as Beau (series 4), Viv's love interest
- Lisa McGrillis as Joanna Franklin (series 4), Jean's sister
- Anna Francolini as Gloria Masters (series 4), a teacher at Cavendish College
- Shak Benjamin as Adedayo (series 4), Eric's love interest from his church
- Bella Maclean as Jem (series 4), Adam's co-worker at the farm
- Imani Yahshua as Tyrone (series 4), a friend of Maeve's in America
- Eshaan Akbar as Principal Lakhani (series 4), headteacher at Cavendish College

=== Guest ===
- Toby Williams as Tim (series 1–2), one of Jean's patients
- Lu Corfield as Sarah (series 1), a mother of three who befriends Maeve
- Anjana Vasan as an anti-abortion activist (series 1)
- Dominic Applewhite as Charlie (series 1), an anti-abortion activist
- T'Nia Miller as Maxine (series 2), the chair of the school board
- Thomas Atkinson as Nick (series 2–3), Anwar's boyfriend
- Stephen Fry as himself (series 2), a quiz host
- Sindhu Vee as Mrs Hanan (series 2), Olivia's mother
- Susan Lynch as Tara Gibbs (series 2), Aimee's mother
- Jack Bandeira as Eli (series 2), a student at Mountview Military Institution
- David Layde as Roland Matthews (series 3–4), Ruby's father who has multiple sclerosis and is Jeffrey's friend
- Miles Jupp as an obstetrician at Moordale community hospital
- Sophie Thompson as Carol Iglehart (series 3), Lily's mother and a nurse
- Jerry Iwu as Oba (series 3), a gay photographer from Nigeria
- Reece Richards as Eugene (series 3), Viv's boyfriend
- Jack Gleeson as Dodgy Mo (series 4), a friend of Sean's
- Andi Osho as Nicky Bowman (series 4), Cal's mother
- Jodie Turner-Smith as God (series 4), an apparition that appears to Eric

== Episodes ==
Series	Episodes	Originally released
1	8	11 January 2019
2	8	17 January 2020
3	8	17 September 2021
4	8	21 September 2023

=== Series 1 (2019) ===
No. overall	No. in series	Episode	Directed by	Written by	Original release date
1	1	Episode 1	Ben Taylor	Laurie Nunn	11 January 2019
2	2	Episode 2	Ben Taylor	Laurie Nunn	11 January 2019
3	3	Episode 3	Ben Taylor	Sophie Goodhart	11 January 2019
4	4	Episode 4	Ben Taylor	Laura Neal and Laurie Nunn	11 January 2019
5	5	Episode 5	Kate Herron	Sophie Goodhart and Laura Hunter	11 January 2019
6	6	Episode 6	Kate Herron	Laurie Nunn and Freddy Syborn	11 January 2019
7	7	Episode 7	Kate Herron	Sophie Goodhart	11 January 2019
8	8	Episode 8	Kate Herron	Laurie Nunn	11 January 2019

=== Series 2 (2020) ===
No. overall	No. in series	Episode	Directed by	Written by	Original release date
9	1	Episode 1	Ben Taylor	Laurie Nunn	17 January 2020
Otis is finally able to masturbate and becomes addicted. Fiona is rumoured to have spread chlamydia at school and seeks Otis's help. Otis takes pity on Fiona when he sees her slut-shamed and realises how much he has missed resolving people's sex issues. Maeve is working at a pretzel shop and runs into her mother Erin. Erin hopes to resolve their issues as she overcomes addiction but Maeve does not trust her. Rahim, a new student from France, is instantly popular at school. Ola tries to give Otis a hand job, but he is unable to get erect and worries that he has broken his penis from masturbating. They walk in on Jean and Jakob having sex and the two parents finally confess to their relationship. A parent-teacher meeting about the chlamydia outbreak leads to the realisation that better sex education is needed and Mr Groff reluctantly turns to Jean. Maeve quits her job and Ms Sands helps her try to rejoin school. Jackson is tired of his mother's pressure to excel in swimming and purposely injures his hand. Maeve meets her new neighbours: Isaac, who uses a wheelchair, and his brother Joe. The real culprit behind the chlamydia crisis is revealed. Otis and Maeve agree to reopen the clinic.
10	2	Episode 2	Sophie Goodhart	Laurie Nunn and Mawaan Rizwan	17 January 2020
Ms Sands and Mr Hendricks unsuccessfully attempt to have sex. Otis tries to get used to Jakob being around. Maeve gets ready for her first day back at school. Jean is called in to address an assembly about sexual health. Maeve attends the aptitude programme and finds herself intimidated by others' ambitions. Jackson has to be tutored since his success at swimming has ended, prompting him to look for a new hobby. After research into fingering, Otis tries it on Ola. She pretends to enjoy it for his confidence but tells Lily that it was terrible. Maeve realises she still has feelings for Otis after seeing him at the fair with Ola. A confused Eric wonders if Rahim is gay and is interested in him when the two ride a Ferris wheel together. Adam befriends two of the boys at military school. He later walks in on his two friends masturbating each other and, even though he promises not to say anything, they plant marijuana in his bed, leading to his expulsion.
11	3	Episode 3	Sophie Goodhart	Sophie Goodhart	17 January 2020
Olivia has sex with her boyfriend and covers his face with a pillow while she is orgasming. She seeks Otis's help because she thinks she has an ugly orgasm face. Adam is back and working at a corner shop. Aimee bakes a cake for Maeve's birthday, but on the bus to school, a man masturbates and ejaculates on her. She immediately exits the bus and walks instead. Although Aimee seems unbothered, Maeve convinces her to report the sexual assault to the police. Jackson tries out for the school play in a search for a new activity. Realising he needs help to get the lead part, Jackson turns to his tutor Viv for help. Otis and Ola have an awkward family dinner at the Milburns' house, ending in an outburst from Otis. Rahim asks Eric on a date, which ends in a kiss and goes perfectly, but Rahim lives above the shop where Adam works and seeing Adam leaves Eric flustered. Aimee realises the assault had a bigger impact on her than she thought. After Erin's abusive boyfriend kicks her out she arrives at Maeve's doorstep with her three-year-old daughter, Elsie. Maeve attempts to confess her feelings to Otis, but is unable to summon the courage.
12	4	Episode 4	Alice Seabright	Laurie Nunn and Rosie Jones	17 January 2020
Ola tells Otis she is ready to have sex, and he tries to prepare himself. Eric's conflicting emotions lead him to confront Adam, but he is ignored. At school, Otis confides in Eric about losing his virginity. Mr Groff sees his wife visiting Jean's sex clinic. Otis's father Remi arrives unexpectedly, and although he and Jean try to keep things professional, they kiss and almost have sex. Aimee finds it difficult to get onto the bus again. On his way to Ola's, Otis encounters Maeve and ends up looking after her sister while Maeve goes to a quiz competition. She finally confesses that she likes him and he angrily replies that she should have told him sooner. Otis goes to Ola but is unable to have sex. Maeve has an altercation with Isaac and Joe. Adam shows up at Eric's and they go to a landfill site and smash objects together. Adam walks Eric home but instead of leaving, stares at Eric until he finally kisses him. Rahim asks Eric if he wants to be his boyfriend. Ola tells Otis that, if she is to be his girlfriend, he cannot be friends with Maeve.
13	5	Episode 5	Alice Seabright	Laurie Nunn and Richard Gadd	17 January 2020
Ola doubts her relationship with Otis when she fantasises about Lily, and realises she is pansexual. Eric and Otis go on a hiking trip with Remi. Eric tells Otis about his interactions with Adam but Otis is unconvinced because of Adam's previous bullying. Eric replies that Otis is a hypocrite because of his situation with Ola and Maeve. Maeve accompanies her mother to a Narcotics Anonymous meeting, but ends up leaving in anger. She sees Isaac and Joe and learns that Isaac is an orphan who was kicked out of his foster home. Jean admits to Jakob that she kissed Remi and they break up. Mrs Groff asks Mr Groff for a divorce and he moves into the school. Otis realises that Remi cheated on his partner and made the trip to get away from her, not to spend time with Otis. Otis and Eric make up. Eric begins ignoring Adam, and asks Rahim to be his boyfriend. Ola breaks up with Otis and kisses Lily, but Lily does not reciprocate.
14	6	Episode 6	Ben Taylor	Sophie Goodhart	17 January 2020
Otis helps Anwar to be intimate with his boyfriend. Lily avoids Ola. Otis invites a small group of friends to his house to prove to Eric and Ola that he can be relaxed. It escalates into a large house party and he gives a drunken speech insulting Ola and Maeve. Adam confronts Eric about ignoring him. Eric tells him that he cannot be drawn back to being ashamed of who he is, and that Rahim is proud to be with him, whereas Adam is not. Still traumatised from her experience on the bus, Aimee runs away when Steve touches her. Jean and Mrs Groff go out for a night of dancing. Mrs Groff says she feels more free without Mr Groff and Jean realises she misses Jakob. Jackson's cast is removed and his parents and friends are excited that he is able to swim again. Feeling overwhelmed, Jackson has a panic attack and confesses to Viv that he injured himself deliberately. Viv later tells his mothers. Mr Groff finds Jean's notebook with notes about the students' and teachers' sexual issues, including those of his wife, and prints copies of the notebook.
15	7	Episode 7	Ben Taylor	Laurie Nunn	17 January 2020
Mr Groff puts up copies of Jean's notebook around the school, resulting in chaos. Jean finds out about Otis's sex clinic. Ruby informs Otis that they had sex the night of the party, although Otis has no memory of it. They go to a pharmacy to buy her a morning-after pill. Jackson and his mother have a heart-to-heart talk and she accepts that he does not like swimming any more. Eric takes Rahim to his church, where Rahim reveals his discomfort due to his family's escape from religious oppression. Jean asks Jakob to take her back, but he says he can't because she is not ready for the kind of intimacy he wants. Ola and Lily begin dating. Isaac tells Maeve that Erin is only pretending to go to work and Maeve confronts her, warning that she will be kicked out if she lies again. In detention, Maeve, Olivia, Aimee, Ola, Lily, and Viv bond over shared experiences of unwanted sexual advances, and they help Aimee go on the bus again.
16	8	Episode 8	Ben Taylor	Laurie Nunn	17 January 2020
Jean tries unsuccessfully to talk to Otis about the sex clinic and they continue to avoid one another. Jean finds out that she is pregnant. Maeve and the quiz team compete at the nationals. With help from Isaac and Joe, Maeve learns that her mother relapsed into drug use and reports her to social services. Erin and Elsie are escorted out by police and Erin vows that she will never forgive Maeve. Otis and Remi have a frank conversation about Remi's absenteeism. The school puts on a sex-charged alien-themed musical adaptation of Romeo and Juliet. Jackson plays the lead role. With Viv's encouragement he is able to get over his anxiety. Mr Groff tries to stop the musical and blames it on Jean's sex education, but Otis defends her. Adam bursts in and declares his feelings for Eric, who reciprocates, and Rahim leaves heartbroken. Mr Groff is placed on leave by the school administrator. Otis leaves Maeve a voicemail apologizing for everything and admits he loves her, but Isaac sends Otis away when he shows up at her door and deletes the message.

=== Series 3 (2021) ===
No. overall	No. in series	Episode	Directed by	Written by	Original release date
17	1	Episode 1	Ben Taylor	Laurie Nunn	17 September 2021
Hope Haddon is Moordale Secondary School's new headmistress and promises to get the school back on track. Otis tries to keep casual sex with Ruby a secret, and discovers a "Sex King" is giving out fraudulent sex advice in the abandoned toilets. Jean promotes a book about her experiences teaching sex education at Moordale, and struggles to tell Jakob about her pregnancy. Eric and Adam go public with their relationship, though Adam has problems with people making fun of his sexuality. Mr Groff, living with his rich, shallow brother, tries in vain to obtain a teaching job. While conducting a television interview, Hope is interrupted by a naked student running around the campus in a panic after having his clothes mistakenly confiscated. Otis and Maeve confront Kyle, the "Sex King". Ms Sands encourages Maeve to apply for a study programme in the United States. Ruby decides to no longer hide her relationship with Otis. Otis tips off Hope about the sex clinic, and Hope has the abandoned toilets demolished.
18	2	Episode 2	Ben Taylor	Sophie Goodhart	17 September 2021
Adam puts off revealing his relationship with Eric to his mother. Otis and Ruby's relationship is public. Jean and Jakob decide to co-parent Jean's expected child but Ola is uncomfortable. Hope implements new guidelines and cracks down on sexually suggestive content at the school. Viv volunteers herself and Jackson to paint over wall covered with graffiti, but Cal, a non-binary student, talks Jackson out of it. Mr Groff continues to struggle with unemployment and, after overhearing his brother complaining, he moves in to Mr Hendricks's house. Jean and Jakob try couples therapy. Maeve asks Otis to arrange therapy sessions with Jean for Aimee, who is struggling to be intimate with Steve. Eric and Adam try to have sex, but Adam fails to communicate properly that he wants to be the bottom, leading Eric to believe he is not interested. Otis gives Adam advice on how to express himself more comfortably; Adam visits Eric and they spend the night together. At Elsie's foster home, Maeve has a confrontation with Erin, who refuses to speak to her. Maeve and Isaac kiss before he reveals he deleted Otis's voice message; Maeve feels betrayed and leaves. Hope demotes Jackson, makes Viv head girl, and mandates school uniforms.
19	3	Episode 3	Ben Taylor	Laurie Nunn and Alice Seabright	17 September 2021
Jakob and Ola move into Jean's house, but friction develops between Otis and Ola. Aimee starts therapy with Jean. Hope puts Viv in charge of uniform compliance, which Cal resists. Jackson begins a friendship with Cal. Otis, Ruby, Eric, and Adam go on a double date. Eric is hurt when Adam describes him as just a friend to his mother and her new boyfriend. Ruby reluctantly takes Otis back to her home, where he meets her bedridden father, Roland, who smokes medical cannabis supplied by Jeffrey to ease his pain. Otis advises Jeffrey on helping Cynthia process her grief over the accidental death of their cat. With Isaac's help, Maeve improves her relationship with Erin. Otis and Ola reach an understanding about their living arrangements. Ruby calls Otis and tells him she loves him, but Otis cannot bring himself to say the same to her.
20	4	Episode 4	Runyararo Mapfumo	Selina Lim	17 September 2021
Ruby avoids Otis's attempts to talk to her. Maeve submits her application to the study programme in America. Jean and Jakob continue couples therapy, but Jakob remains sceptical. Lily submits a story to the local paper. Hope introduces a new Relationship and Sex Education programme based on abstinence. Otis and Maeve protest at the information supplied, and are sent out of the class. Jean struggles with her pregnancy and with finding common ground with Jakob. Jakob finds a piece of men's jewellery in Jean's house. Maeve discovers someone paid her fee for a school trip to France and assumes it was Elsie's foster parent. Mr and Mrs Groff bump into each other; Mrs Groff encourages Mr Groff to contact Adam, but Mr Groff misinterprets her words as an invitation to get back together. Maeve has a dinner date with Isaac. When Otis admits he does not love Ruby, she breaks up with him.
21	5	Episode 5	Ben Taylor	Mawaan Rizwan	17 September 2021
Eric and his family travel to Nigeria for a wedding while the rest of the sixth-form class visit a battlefield of the Battle of the Somme. Eric's mother asks him not to draw attention to himself. Viv informs Jackson and Cal of a forum where they can raise their concerns, but Cal is unconvinced. Otis tries unsuccessfully to apologise to Ruby. Jean runs into Hope at the hospital, where they have a terse conversation about sex education at Moordale. Aimee reveals to Maeve that her mother paid Maeve's trip fee, opening a rift between them. Jackson and Cal hallucinate after taking psilocybin mushrooms on the school bus, creating a chain reaction that results in Rahim causing a car crash. Adam takes the blame for Rahim. Otis and Maeve are stranded when the bus leaves without them. When Jean and Jakob run into an ex of Jean's, Jakob admits he does not trust Jean and suggests a paternity test. Otis and Maeve confess their feelings for each other and kiss. Maeve tells Otis she needs time to process her thoughts.
22	6	Episode 6	Runyararo Mapfumo	Temi Wilkey	17 September 2021
Maeve is accepted into the programme but the school is unable to provide her funding. Lily's story is published, causing more bad press for the school. Hope is pressured by investors and the school board for results. Hope punishes Cal, Lily and Adam in front of the students; Rahim protests and is suspended. Maeve finds out Erin kidnapped Elsie from the foster home. When Otis and Isaac compete with each other to help Maeve, she throws both of them out. Mr Groff returns Jean's notebook; they sit down for a therapy session where Jean encourages Mr Groff to find something that gives him happiness. Hope gives Viv an assignment to make a presentation for the school's forthcoming open day but Viv secretly records Hope's dismissive remark about students' concerns and sends it to the other students. Otis rebukes Jean when she asks him about Maeve after Aimee accidentally mentioned her. Adam asks Rahim for help with writing poetry for Eric. At the wedding, Eric meets a photographer, Oba, who takes him to a gay club where they end up kissing.
23	7	Episode 7	Runyararo Mapfumo	Sophie Goodhart	17 September 2021
It is open day at Moordale Secondary School. Lily skips school and hides from Ola, who asks Otis to intervene. Maeve apologises to Isaac, but he does not want to enter into a relationship with her if she is unsure about him. Maeve and Aimee reconcile and track down Erin and Elsie; Erin allows Elsie to return to the foster home. Hope locks Cal in a room to prevent them from disrupting open day. Viv gives a video presentation in which the students defiantly declare they are proud to be known as the "Sex School". Hope attempts to stop the video, but Ruby fights her off. While conducting a television interview, Jean goes into labour. Jakob opens up about his late wife to the therapist. Jackson and Cal kiss, but stop because Cal wants Jackson to understand Cal as a non-binary person rather than as female. Otis gives Lily a pep talk. Eric reveals to Adam that he kissed Oba. Mr Groff discovers an interest in cooking, and stands up for himself when his brother belittles him at a dinner party. He opens up to Mrs Groff, and they sleep together. Jean gives birth to a girl, but suffers a haemorrhage. Otis and Maeve make up and kiss.
24	8	Episode 8	Runyararo Mapfumo	Laurie Nunn	17 September 2021
Adam enters a dog agility competition. Lily takes down her alien paraphernalia and asks her mother to dispose of it; after an autograph request from a fan, she changes her mind. Hope is removed from her position. Jean wakes up from surgery, and receives the paternity test results, which shock her. Erin sneaks into the school and gives Maeve the money for the programme, but Maeve decides not to go because she does not want to leave Otis when they just got together. Jackson and Cal settle their differing opinions about a queer relationship precluding them from becoming a couple, after which they part amicably as friends. The students learn that the school will be sold to developers, so they will need to find alternative schooling arrangements. Otis bumps into Hope at the hospital, who is attempting another round of in vitro fertilisation after trying unsuccessfully for three years to get pregnant. Jean overhears Otis comforting Hope. Lily and Ola make amends. Adam forgives Eric for kissing Oba, but Eric breaks up with him, feeling that he is losing part of himself due to the struggle of being with someone uncomfortable with their identity. Adam finally tells Mrs Groff that Eric was his boyfriend, and it is revealed that he wrote a heartfelt poem about his feelings for Eric. Mrs Groff turns down dinner with Mr Groff. Aimee persuades Maeve to pursue the study programme in the United States. Otis and Maeve say their farewells.

=== Series 4 (2023) ===
No. overall	No. in series	Episode	Directed by	Written by	Original release date
25	1	Episode 1	Dominic Leclerc	Laurie Nunn	21 September 2023
Maeve is studying in the US while trying to make her long-distance relationship with Otis work. She sends Otis a nude photo; Otis takes photos to send her, but loses his nerve and does not reply. Otis, Eric, Aimee, Jackson, Cal, Viv, and Ruby arrive at Cavendish College, and find that its students are friendly, inclusive, and environmentally aware. They meet the most popular students, known as "the Coven". Michael struggles to fit in, as does Ruby, while Eric makes friends with the Coven. Isaac enrolls at Cavendish with the hope of going to university. Aimee accidentally offends him. Otis attempts to restart his clinic, but discovers Cavendish already has a student sex therapist, "O". He promotes his clinic in a presentation but accidentally shows his naked photos. Cal is taking testosterone and struggles with an increased sex drive; Otis reassures them. Adam begins an apprenticeship on a nearby farm. Jean adjusts to life as a single parent after breaking up with Jakob. She gets a new job but Otis worries that she does not have the time or energy to make it work. Eric's mother wants him to be baptised. Otis and Maeve make up and have phone sex.
26	2	Episode 2	Dominic Leclerc	Troy Hunter	21 September 2023
Jackson is having a casual sexual relationship with Annabelle, who unexpectedly stimulates his prostate, causing him to question his sexuality. As his clinic struggles against O's popularity, Otis successfully counsels Roman and Abbi, and other students ask him for advice. O and Otis agree only one of their clinics can prosper and hold an election to decide which will remain. Jean is unable to deal with her new job and care for Joy, so Otis asks Jean's sister to assist. Otis become jealous of one of Maeve's classmates, unaware they are homosexual. Adam needs driving lessons for his apprenticeship, and overcomes his fear of horses. Eric attends a baptism information session at his church, but is unsure if he wants to proceed. Michael has dinner with Maureen and Adam, but inadvertently belittles Adam's apprenticeship. Annabelle mentions a lump on one of Jackson's testicles. Aimee makes up with Isaac. Maeve upsets Otis when she tells him a possible internship with her teacher could extend her absence indefinitely; they both decide they need some space. O's campaign video goes viral, so Otis enlists Ruby as his campaign manager. Michael apologises to Adam and offers to give him driving lessons, which he accepts.
27	3	Episode 3	Dominic Leclerc	Krishna Istha	21 September 2023
In a flashback, eleven-year-old Ruby struggles to fit in with her peers and is bullied. After she wets the bed at summer camp, her new friend, Sarah, helps her clean up, but later tells everyone at the camp. Eric and Otis plan to attend a gay club night. Otis works on his therapist campaign at Ruby's house. Eric goes to Roman's house with the Coven. Adam has his first driving lesson with his father. Isaac helps Aimee with her art project, and the two nearly kiss. Viv invites classmate Beau to her house. Jackson gets his testicle lump checked and realises he has no medical knowledge about his sperm-donor father. Eric bonds with the Coven and tells Otis he need not go to the club night. Ruby tells Otis that O is Sarah, and they fall asleep together. Viv and Beau kiss. The Coven, Eric and Cal attend the club night: Eric takes ecstasy and hooks up with a boy from his church. Cal gets close to Aisha before finding they are in a relationship. Molloy harshly critiques Maeve's writing, and gives the internship to her roommate Ellen. Maeve is told her mother has overdosed; she returns home from America.
28	4	Episode 4	Michelle Savill	Selina Lim	21 September 2023
Michael goes on a date but has trouble performing. Jean's radio show is not good: she is distracted, overly clinical and boring. She asks Joanna for help with Joy, but Joanna is focused on her new boyfriend, Dan. Aimee and Otis accompany Maeve to see her mother in hospital. When Beau is reassured by Viv that Jackson and she are just friends, he asks her to be his girlfriend. Maeve meets Sean at the hospital, where they learn that their mother has died. Sean departs quickly, while Maeve remains. Waiting in the car, Otis counsels Aimee on her feelings for Isaac. Ruby keeps Otis's clients away from O while they have a live campaign debate. O is hired as a co-host to improve Jean's radio show. Eric helps out at a soup kitchen run by his church, and starts seeing biblical signs suggesting he be baptised. Michael gets advice from Jean and O on his love life, and realises he still loves Maureen; he goes to her house and they kiss passionately. Ruby continuously updates Otis on the campaign, but he ignores her. Maeve leaves the hospital, and stays at her foster mother's house with Aimee and Otis.
29	5	Episode 5	Michelle Savill	Ethan Harvey	21 September 2023
Maeve and Sean arrange their mother's funeral. Joy's doctor is worried that Jean may have postnatal depression. Jackson resolves to discover his father but does not tell his mothers. Otis is guilty about sleeping with Ruby. In a debate, O accuses Otis of having views like his misogynist father, and several students reveal that O ghosted them. O reveals she is asexual and apologises for her behaviour. Jean's producer hires O as a permanent co-host. Aimee tells Maeve about Isaac but Maeve defers the conversation. Eric's church's soup kitchen loses its funding and Abbi pledges proceeds from the Cavendish fundraiser to the programme. Maeve and Otis date, but are joined by Joanna who has been stood up by Dan. Joanna and Maeve get drunk and have to leave the cinema. Aisha tells Cal she is in a polyamorous relationship, and they go on a date. Viv, Beau, and Jackson attend the cinema, where Beau is jealous of Viv and Jackson's closeness. Maeve and Otis trespass on the Moordale campus and start to have sex. They stop when Otis reveals his night with Ruby, and the police arrive. Jean is called to collect Otis, and meets Maeve for the first time.
30	6	Episode 6	Alyssa McClelland	Annalisa D'Inella	21 September 2023
Eric starts to have confusing dreams about God and being baptised. Having ignored Ruby since their night together, Otis contacts her but she quits as his campaign manager and leaves in tears. Aimee agrees not to date Isaac after Maeve tells her it would make her uncomfortable. Aisha and Cal hook up in a Cavendish toilet, but Cal gets upset when their period starts. Maeve and Aimee go to the funeral parlour, but Sean has not arrived with the flowers. Otis and Eric have an argument: Eric complains about Otis' selfish behaviour, but Otis refuses to respond. Maeve is surprised when many friends attend her mother's funeral, after Aimee secretly invited them. Sean arrives, gives a bitter and honest eulogy, and angrily leaves. Mr Hendricks plays Erin's favourite song on the piano. Otis and Eric agree that they need some time from each other. Maeve forgives Otis and decides not to return to America. Adam realises that his parents have been sleeping together without his knowledge. Jackson is cleared of cancer, but falls out with Viv when he mentions Beau's obsessive and controlling behaviour. Ruby posts a video of her bed-wetting incident.
31	7	Episode 7	Alyssa McClelland	Bella Heesom	21 September 2023
In a flashback, Jean witnesses her mother's boyfriend abusing twelve-year-old Joanna. Jean quits her radio show after it is suspended. She offers Joanna money to repay her debts, but with conditions. Maeve and Otis arrange dinner with Jean. Jackson finds no record of him at Moordale sperm bank. Beau accuses Viv of flirting with another student and assaults her. A broken lift stops Otis, O and Isaac reaching an exam room; Isaac and Aimee activate the fire alarm to highlight campus accessibility issues. Adam flattens a fence driving the farm tractor. After fighting with Jean, Joanna leaves as Maeve arrives. Otis and O mend their relationship. Maeve and Jean talk; Maeve says Molloy's criticism is why she won't return. Adam expects to be dismissed from the farm, but isn't; he tells Michael that he thinks Michael hates him. Jackson finds a letter to his mother from someone he suspects is his father. Beau continues to pester Viv and Jackson comforts her. Maeve tells Otis she wants to return to America indefinitely; they confess their love for each other and have sex. Maeve tells Aimee and Isaac to pursue their feelings for each other; they scatter Maeve's mother's ashes together.
32	8	Episode 8	Alyssa McClelland	Thara Popoola	21 September 2023
Maeve returns to America; she and Otis agree to suspend contact. Aimee can't get intimate with Isaac. Otis berates Jean for encouraging Maeve to leave. O publicly apologises to Ruby. Michael apologises to Adam and joins his equestrian class. Adam accepts his parents' reconciliation and discloses he is bisexual to Jem, who asks him on a date. Eric leaves his church which will not accept him. Jackson finds Jerome who rebuffs him; his mothers and Viv comfort him. Cal runs away, but is convinced they are valued by Eric and Jackson. Viv ends her abusive relationship with Beau. Aimee takes self-portraits wearing the jeans she was assaulted in, then destroys them. Ruby and Otis encourage voters to give O another chance. Ruby joins the Coven but finishes her friendship with Otis. On Jean's resumed radio show, Joanna talks about her assault; she decides to stay with Jean. Dan learns Joy is his daughter from Jean. Maeve is contacted by a publisher, and confronts Molloy about how his negativity affects students. Aimee and Isaac finally kiss. Otis and Eric resume their friendship. Otis makes up with Jean, and admits he is heartbroken by Maeve's departure. Otis finds a note Maeve left.

== Production ==
=== Development ===
On 28 November 2017, it was announced that Netflix had given the production a series order. The series was created by Laurie Nunn, with Ben Taylor expected to direct. Executive producers were set to include Jamie Campbell and Joel Wilson via their production company Eleven Film. On 4 December 2018, it was announced that the series would premiere on 11 January 2019. On 1 February 2019, Netflix renewed the show for a second series which premiered on 17 January 2020. On 10 February 2020, Netflix renewed the show for a third series. As part of a video and letter to its shareholders in April 2021, Netflix's co-chief executive officer and chief content officer, Ted Sarandos, confirmed that the third series of Sex Education was expected to be released sometime in the second half of 2021. On 24 June 2021, it was announced that the third series would premiere on 17 September 2021. On 25 September 2021, eight days after the premiere of the third series, it was announced that Sex Education had been renewed for a fourth series. On 5 July 2023, it was announced that the fourth season would be the last.

=== Casting ===
On 17 May 2018, it was announced that Gillian Anderson, Emma Mackey, Asa Butterfield, Ncuti Gatwa, Connor Swindells, and Kedar Williams-Stirling had joined the show's main cast. On 16 July 2018, it was reported that James Purefoy had been cast in a recurring role. Dan Levy, Thaddea Graham, Lisa McGrillis and Eshaan Akbar joined the cast in series 4, while Simone Ashley, Tanya Reynolds and Patricia Allison did not return.

=== Filming ===
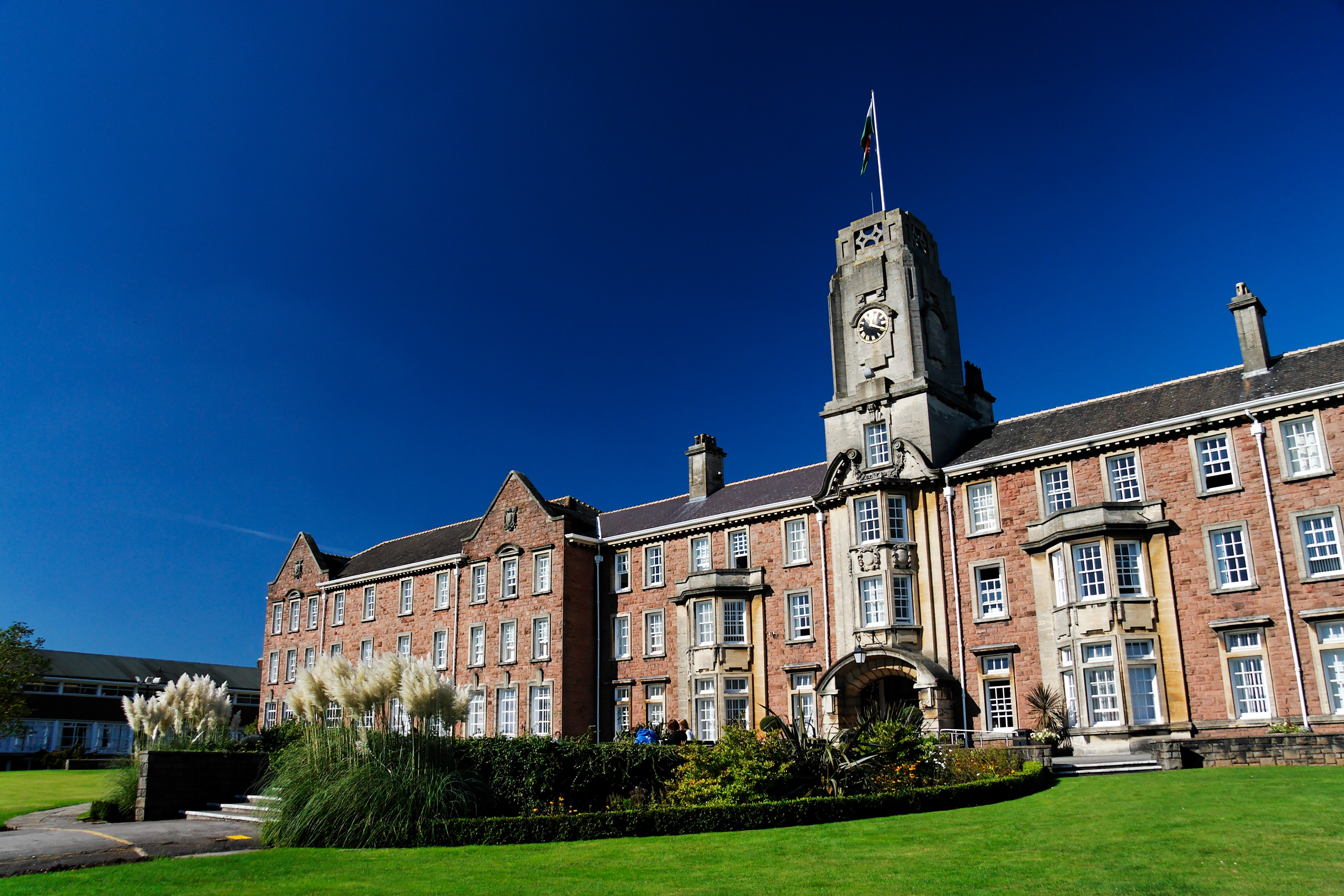
The former Caerleon campus of the University of South Wales in Caerleon, Newport

Filming for the first series took place at several locations in the Wye Valley in both Wales and England, including Llandogo, Tintern, Symonds Yat, Monmouth, and Redbrook. Filming was also progressed in Penarth, Vale of Glamorgan during 2018. The scenes set at Moordale Secondary School were filmed at the former Caerleon campus of the University of South Wales in Caerleon, Newport. Scenes set in the swimming pool were filmed at the Newport International Sports Village complex. Filming for the second series took place from May to September 2019, and included scenes filmed in the Forest of Dean.

In February 2021 during filming for the third series, production visited several locations in Kent. Filming took place at Shorncliffe Military Cemetery in Sandgate and the Hawthorne Trench, which both double as WWI locations in France for Episode 5. Production also visited the Harbour Arm in Folkestone Harbour to film a scene for Episode 7.

=== Setting and aesthetics ===
The setting of Sex Education appears to be modern-day Britain, in the fictional village of Moordale, with various elements that serve to place the show in an uncertain time and location. Modern technology, such as smartphones, exists, but the show features very few cars from after the 1990s, with most cars featured ranging from the 1970s to the 1990s. Police cars seen during the finale of series two appear to follow 1990s aesthetics rather than modern-day police cars. The show heavily features older technologies such as CRT televisions and dated household appliances. The décor of the Groffs' house is reminiscent of popular 1970s décor; Maeve's caravan is typical of the 1990s–2000s; and the Milburns' house is a more modern décor with a modern, "American-style" fridge. Moordale Secondary School shows some elements of UK secondary schools but also has a more American high school image. According to showrunner Laurie Nunn, the show's aesthetic is deliberate and an homage to the 1980s films of John Hughes.

== Release ==
On 2 January 2019, the official trailer for the series was released.

=== Audience viewership ===
On 17 January 2019, Netflix announced that the series was on pace to have been streamed by over 40 million viewers within its first month of release. According to Netflix Top 10 global viewership, Sex Education was watched for over 447,750,000 hours between 12 September and 24 October 2021.

=== Manga adaptation ===
On 15 July 2022, a manga adaptation illustrated by John Tarachine began serialization in Kadokawa Corporation's Comic Bridge online manga magazine.

== Reception ==
=== Critical response ===
Critical response of Sex Education
Series	Rotten Tomatoes	Metacritic
1	91% (80 reviews)	79 (19 reviews)
2	98% (57 reviews)	83 (11 reviews)
3	98% (42 reviews)	83 (11 reviews)
4	91% (44 reviews)	69 (18 reviews)

==== Series 1 ====
Review aggregation website Rotten Tomatoes reports that 91% of 80 critic ratings were positive for the first series, with an average rating of 8.10/10. The website's critical consensus reads, "Bawdy, heartfelt, and surprisingly wise, Sex Education is a raucous romp through a group of teenagers whose sexual misadventures are so thoughtfully rendered, adults could learn a thing or two from them." Metacritic calculated a weighted average score of 79 out of 100 from 19 critics, indicating "generally favourable reviews".

==== Series 2 ====
On Rotten Tomatoes, the second series has an approval rating of 98% with an average rating of 8.30/10, based on 57 reviews. The critical consensus reads, "Sex Education's sophomore season definitely has more going on, but by treating each new subject with care and humour, it leaves plenty of space for its characters to grow." On Metacritic, the series has a score of 83 out of 100, based on reviews from 11 critics, indicating "universal acclaim".

==== Series 3 ====
On Rotten Tomatoes, the third series has an approval rating of 98% with an average rating of 8.50/10, based on 42 reviews. The critical consensus reads, "With a seemingly endless desire to dive deeper into its characters paired perfectly with its talented ensemble, Sex Education's third season is a masterclass in brutally honest, brilliantly heartfelt comedy." On Metacritic, the series has a score of 83 out of 100, based on reviews from 11 critics, indicating "universal acclaim". The third series won Best Comedy Series at the 50th International Emmy Awards.

==== Series 4 ====
On Rotten Tomatoes, the fourth series debuted with an approval rating of 91%, with an average of 7.5/10, based on 44 reviews. The critical consensus reads, "As sweetly empathetic and inclusive as ever, Sex Education's final season serves as a bittersweet – but largely satisfying – farewell." On Metacritic, the series has a score of 69 out of 100, based on reviews from 18 critics, indicating a "generally favorable" reception.

== Legacy ==
The series was notable for its pioneering portrayal of sexual health, relationships and consent across a diverse range of characters and experiences, which was found to resonate strongly with its teenage audience.

The series also reflected wider changes in television production through its use of intimacy coordinators to choreograph intimate scenes, helping to establish practices focused on performer consent, communication and safety. As Netflix's first production to adopt this approach, the series has been cited in discussions of evolving industry standards for filming intimate content, alongside its broader contribution to conversations about sexuality and representation on screen.

== Awards and nominations ==
Year	Award	Subject	Nominee	Result	Ref.
2019	Online Film and Television Awards	Best Writing in Drama Series	Sex Education	Nominated	
2019	Online Film and Television Awards	Best Supporting Actress in Drama Series	Gillian Anderson	Nominated	
2019	BAFTA Scotland Awards	Best Actor (Television)	Ncuti Gatwa	Nominated	
2019	Gold Derby Film Awards	Breakthrough Performer of the Year	Asa Butterfield	Nominated	
2019	MTV Movie & TV Awards	Best Kiss	Ncuti Gatwa and Connor Swindells	Nominated	
2019	MTV Movie & TV Awards	Breakthrough Performance	Ncuti Gatwa	Nominated	
2020	National Television Awards	Comedy	Sex Education	Nominated	
2020	Gold Derby Film Awards	Comedy Actor	Asa Butterfield	Nominated	
2020	Newport Beach Film Festival	Artist of Distinction	Asa Butterfield	Won	
2020	Guild of Music Supervisors Awards	Best Music Supervision in a Comedy Series	Matt Biffa	Nominated	
2020	GLAAD Media Awards	Outstanding Comedy Series	Sex Education	Nominated	
2020	BAFTA TV Awards	Best Male Comedy Performance	Ncuti Gatwa	Nominated	
2020	BAFTA TV Awards	Best Emerging Talent: Fiction	Laurie Nunn	Nominated	
2020	BAFTA TV Awards	Best Production Design	Samantha Harley and Miri Katz	Nominated	
2020	BAFTA TV Awards	Best Scripted Casting	Lauren Evans	Nominated	
2020	TV Choice Awards	Best Drama Series	Sex Education	Nominated	
2020	British LGBT Awards	Metro Media Moment	Sex Education	Won	
2020	NME Awards	Best TV Actor	Asa Butterfield	Nominated	
2020	BAFTA Scotland Awards	Best Actor (Television)	Ncuti Gatwa	Won	
2020	RTS Programme Awards	Comedy Performance: Male	Ncuti Gatwa	Won	
2020	RTS Programme Awards	Writer: Comedy	Laurie Nunn	Nominated	
2021	Guild of Music Supervisors Awards	Best Music Supervision in a Comedy Series	Matt Biffa	Nominated	
2021	Hollywood Music in Media Awards	Best Music Supervision – Television	Matt Biffa	Nominated	
2021	AACTA International Awards	Best Comedy Series	Sex Education	Nominated	
2021	RTS Programme Awards	Scripted Comedy	Sex Education	Nominated	
2021	GLAAD Media Awards	Outstanding Comedy Series	Sex Education	Nominated	
2021	TRIC Awards	Comedy Programme	Sex Education	Nominated	
2021	BAFTA TV Awards	Best Male Comedy Performance	Ncuti Gatwa	Nominated	
2021	BAFTA TV Awards	Best Female Comedy Performance	Aimee Lou Wood	Won	
2021	BAFTA TV Awards	Best Female Comedy Performance	Emma Mackey	Nominated	
2021	BAFTA TV Awards	Best Costume Design	Rosa Dias	Nominated	
2021	BAFTA TV Awards	Best Production Design	Samantha Harley and Alexandra Slade	Nominated	
2021	BAFTA TV Awards	Best Scripted Casting	Lauren Evans	Nominated	
2021	National Television Awards	Comedy	Sex Education	Nominated	
2022	Critics' Choice Television Awards	Best Supporting Actor in a Comedy Series	Ncuti Gatwa	Nominated	
2022	GLAAD Media Awards	Outstanding Comedy Series	Sex Education	Nominated	
2022	National Comedy Awards	Best Scripted Comedy Series	Sex Education	Won	
2022	National Comedy Awards	Outstanding Comedy Actress	Emma Mackey	Won	
2022	National Comedy Awards	Outstanding Comedy Actor	Asa Butterfield	Won	
2022	National Comedy Awards	Outstanding Supporting Role	Ncuti Gatwa	Won	
2022	National Comedy Awards	Outstanding Supporting Role	Aimee Lou Wood	Nominated	
2022	BAFTA TV Awards	Best Male Comedy Performance	Ncuti Gatwa	Nominated	
2022	BAFTA TV Awards	Best Female Comedy Performance	Aimee Lou Wood	Nominated	
2022	BAFTA TV Awards	Best Photography & Lighting: Fiction	Oli Russell	Nominated	
2022	BAFTA TV Awards	Best Scripted Casting	Lauren Evans	Nominated	
2022	BAFTA TV Awards	Best Emerging Talent: Fiction	Runyararo Mapfumo	Nominated	
2022	National Television Awards	Comedy	Sex Education	Nominated	
2022	Televisual Bulldog Awards	Music	Sex Education	Won	
2022	Televisual Bulldog Awards	Editing	Sex Education	Won	
2022	International Emmy Awards	Best Comedy Series	Sex Education	Won	
2022	BAFTA Scotland Awards	Best Actor (Television)	Ncuti Gatwa	Nominated	
2022	BAFTA Scotland Awards	'Scot on Screen' Audience Award	Ncuti Gatwa	Nominated	
2022	RTS Craft & Design Awards	Best Director – Comedy	Ben Taylor	Nominated	
2022	RTS Craft & Design Awards	Best Editing – Comedy	Sex Education	Nominated	
2024	Televisual Bulldog Awards	Comedy	Sex Education	Won	

== Style ==
Sex Education is often noted for its unique visual language and aesthetics, which employs American teen culture tropes into a British setting. Inspired by the filmography of John Hughes and the teen comedies of the 1980s, the series incorporates several elements, motifs and designs evocative of those films, and American teen media in general, such as students idling around lockers, non-uniform school dress codes and students sporting letterman jackets. Series director Ben Taylor said: "When [Laurie Nunn] was writing the script and the world, they tended to be on the whole more American references to the school experience I've seen in film and TV than any British ones. There was a tone in the script that was about warmth and positivity. It was just a sort of rendering the school experience as a positive thing, which we tend not to do in this country. I think it also visually elevates it to a slightly more expansive canvas". Anderson said that the US cultural references were intended to appeal to American audiences. On the retrograde setting, notably reminiscent of the 1980s, Taylor explained: "It was always contemporary ... It was just something we chose not to foreground so much, so that it wasn't about a generation of kids who are obsessed with their phones."
