= Kitamura Sae bibliography =

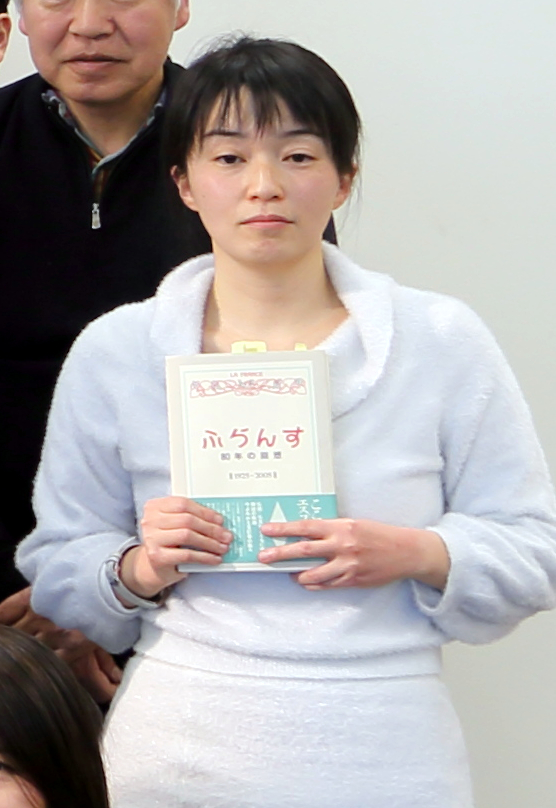
- Kitamura Sae in Tokyo in 2019
- Books↙: 11 (as sole author) + 18 (as co-author)
- Articles↙: 12
- Translations↙: 1 (as sole translator) + 2 (as co-translator)

The bibliography of Kitamura Sae, a Japanese scholar specialising in British literature and a literary critic, includes books (sole author or co-author), journals, theses, and online columns. The source is from Japan Science and Technology Agency.

Kitamura's main subjects of her work include William Shakespeare, the history of performing arts, and synesthesia. Her notable works include Women Who Enjoyed Shakespeare's Plays (Japanese: シェイクスピア劇を楽しんだ女性たち ―近世の観劇と読書―), Sugar, Spice, and Something Explosive (Japanese: お砂糖とスパイスと爆発的な何か ― 不真面目な批評家によるフェミニスト批評入門 ―), and The Classroom of Critique (Japanese: 批評の教室 ― チョウのように読み、ハチのように書く ―).

== Books ==
- Kitamura, Sae (March 2018). シェイクスピア劇を楽しんだ女性たち ― 近世の観劇と読書 ― [Women Who Enjoyed Shakespeare's Plays] (in Japanese). Hakusuisha. ISBN 978-4-560-09600-0.
- — (June 2019). お砂糖とスパイスと爆発的な何か ― 不真面目な批評家によるフェミニスト批評入門 ― [Sugar, Spice, and Something Explosive] (in Japanese). Kankanbou. ISBN 978-4-863-85365-2.
  - — (February 2025). ［増補］お砂糖とスパイスと爆発的な何か : 不真面目な批評家によるフェミニスト批評入門 [Sugar, Spice, and Something Explosive - Supplement version -]. ちくま新書 (in Japanese). 筑摩書房. ISBN 978-4-480-44008-2.
- —. 不真面目な批評家、文学・文化の英語をマジメに語る ―シェイクスピアはなぜ「儲かる」のか？― [A unserious critic's serious talk about literary and cultural English]. EJ新書 (in Japanese). ALC PRESS INC. ASIN B086DS9WSF.
- —. 不真面目な批評家、文学・文化の英語をマジメに語る 2 ― シェイクスピア、クイーン、SHERLOCK etc. 古典から最新エンタメまで！― [A unserious critic's serious talk about literary and cultural English 2]. EJ新書 (in Japanese). ALC PRESS INC. ASIN B08HH1TQLJ.
- — (2021-09-07). 批評の教室―チョウのように読み、ハチのように書く [The Classroom of Critique]. ちくま新書 (in Japanese). Chikuma Shobō. ISBN 978-4480074256.
- — (2022-06-29). お嬢さんと嘘と男たちのデス・ロード―ジェンダー・フェミニズム批評入門 [The Lady, the Lies, and the Death Road] (in Japanese). Bungeishunjū. ISBN 978-4163915609.
- — (2023-06-21). 英語の路地裏―オアシスからクイーン、シェイクスピアまで歩く [English Back Alley] (in Japanese). アルク. ISBN 978-4757440173.
- — (2024-11-12). 女の子が死にたくなる前に見ておくべきサバイバルのためのガールズ洋画100選 [100 Survival Movies for Girls to Watch Before Die] (in Japanese). Kankanbou. ISBN 978-4863856417.
- — (2024-09-01). 学校では教えてくれないシェイクスピア 「名作」と友達になる [The Shakespeare schools never teach] (in Japanese). Asahi Press. ISBN 978-4255013725.

=== Self-publications ===
Kitamura has obtained an ISBN as a private publisher and has published the work of the Society for the Study of Representation and Culture and the Japanese Association of Historical Studies.

- Kitamura, Sae (April 2012). 共感覚の地平 ――共感できるか?. ISBN 978-4-9906091-0-8.
- 西洋史若手研究者問題検討ワーキング (January 2015). 西洋史若手研究者問題アンケート調査最終報告書. ISBN 978-4-9906091-0-8.

=== As co-author ===
- "「悲劇」「問題劇」" ["Tragedy", "Problem plays"]. シェイクスピア・ハンドブック [Shakespeare Handbook]. Sanseidō. 2010. pp. 74–106, 138–145. ISBN 978-4385410647.
- "Queens, Girls and Freaks: Men in Women's Clothes and Female Audiences in Japanese Cross-Dressing Productions of As You Like It and Hedwig and the Angry Inch". Queer Crossings, Theories, Bodies, Texts. Mimesis International. 2012. pp. 161–178. ISBN 978-8857509396.
- "1, 6". オックスフォードブリテン諸島の歴史 第7巻 ―17世紀 1603年-1688年― [The Seventeenth Century: The Short Oxford History of the British Isles]. Keio University Press Inc.. 2015. ISBN 978-4766416473.
- "キャトリン・モラン『女になる方法』書評" [Review: How to Be a Woman by Caitlin Moran]. いま、世界で読まれている105冊 [eau bleu issue]. テン・ブックス. 2013. pp. 108–109. ISBN 978-4886960306.
- 共感覚から見えるもの ―アートと科学を彩る五感の世界―. Bensei Publishing Inc.. 2016. ISBN 978-4585210337.
- 小澤実; 中丸禎子; 高橋美野梨, eds. (2016). "音楽の錬金術師、氷の国のうたびとビョーク". アイスランド・グリーンランド・北極を知るための65章. エリア・スタディーズ. 明石書店. pp. 259–263. ISBN 978-4750343082.
- "The Good, the Bad and the Beautiful: Women Writers' Difficult Relationships with the 'Bad Woman' Character in Antony and Cleopatra". Lilith Rising: Perspectives on Evil and the Feminine. Inter-Disciplinary Press. 2016. ISBN 978-1848883864.
- Pascale Aebischer; Susanne Greenhalgh; Laurie Osborne, eds. (2018). "The Curious Incident of Shakespeare Fans in NTLive: Public Screenings and Fan Culture in Japan".". Shakespeare and the 'Live' Theatre Broadcast Experience. Bloomsbury Arden. pp. 177–184. ISBN 978-1350030466.
- Hiro Hirai, ed. (2019). "フランセス・イェイツ『世界劇場』". ルネサンス・バロックのブックガイド ― 印刷革命から魔術・錬金術までの知のコスモス. Kōsakusha. ISBN 978-4875025030.
- "地球人には家族は手に負えないークィアSFとしての『美しい星』". 彼女たちの三島由紀夫 [Their Yukio Mishima]. Chūōkōron-sha. 2020. pp. 48–50. ISBN 9784120053474.
- 小森謙一郎; 戸塚学; 北村紗衣 (February 2022). "もしも私が女なら――シェイクスピア劇と舞台芸術の異性装, Part2, Chapter 5". 人文学のレッスン ― 文学・芸術・歴史 ― [Humanities Lessons - Literature, Art, and History -]. Suiseisha. ISBN 978-4801006058.
- "うぬぼれ屋さん、この文章もたぶん自分のことだと思ってるんでしょ?」". 反「女性差別カルチャー」読本. Tababooks. May 2022.
- "嫌われものを授業に取り込む". 現場の大学論：大学改革を超えて未来を拓くために. Nakanishiya Shuppan. July 2022. pp. 165–176. ISBN 978-4779515453.
- "ゲームとジェンダー、ポリティカル・コレクトネス". 知的財産で社会を変える : SSP-IPの挑戦 [Solving Social Problems through Intellectual Properties]. Doyukan. December 2022. pp. 16–93. ISBN 978-4496056352.
- "ソーシャルメディア" [Social Media]. ジェンダー事典 [Encyclopedia of Gender]. Maruzen CHI Holdings. 2024. pp. 572–573. ISBN 978-4621308875.
- "眠れない登場人物、眠りすぎの登場人物―シェイクスピア劇における睡眠の演劇的効果―". 睡眠文化論. Tankosha. 2025. ISBN 978-4473046581.
- 北村紗衣; 小森謙一郎; 嶋内博愛; 戸塚学 (2025). シンデレラの末永く幸せな変身. Suiseisha. ISBN 978-4-8010-0851-9.
- "研究成果をもっとウィキペディアに！―学会、図書館、博物館との連携―". 人文学を社会に開くには。：パブリックヒューマニティーズから考え・行動する [Opening the humanities to society : thinking and practicing through public humanities]. Bungaku-Report. 2025. ISBN 978-4-86766-086-7.

== Journals and theses ==
- Kitamura, Sae (2007). "歪んだ王冠と道化 ―クレオパトラの死と女王の二つの身体―" [The Crown Awry and the Clown : The Death of Cleopatra and the Queen's Two Bodies.]. 比較文学・文化論集. 24: 1–17. hdl:2261/48936.
- — (2008). "雅にして強かなる罠 ―『アントニーとクレオパトラ』における紳士の形成の危機―" ["In Her Strong Toil of Grace" : A Crisis in the Fashioning of the Gentleman in Antony and Cleopatra]. 比較文学・文化論集. 25: 1–16. hdl:2261/48942.
- — (2009). "イギリス・ルネサンスにおける「クレオパトラ文学」--シェイクスピアのクレオパトラとその姉妹たち" ['Cleopatra literature' in the English renaissance: Shakespeare's Cleopatra and her sisters]. 超域文化科学紀要. 14: 69–87. hdl:2261/51723.
- — (2009). "おネエと女とフリークス ―『お気に召すまま』と『ヘドウィグ・アンド・アングリー・インチ』―" [Queens, Girls and Freaks : As You Like It and Hedwig and the Angry Inch]. 比較文学・文化論集. 26: 26–44. hdl:2261/48948.
- — (2010). "孤独とミソジニー ―岡田利規演出『友達』―" [Solitude and Misogyny : OKADA Toshiki's Tomodachi (Friends)]. 比較文学・文化論集. 27: 9–12. hdl:2261/36013.
- — (2011). "J・M・クッツェー作『夷狄を待ちながら』における月経の表現(関東英文学研究)" [Menstruation in J. M. Coetzee's Waiting for the barbarians]. 英文学研究 支部統合号. 3: 149–167. doi:10.20759/elsjregional.3.0_149.
- — (October 2013). The Role of Women in the Canonisation of Shakespeare: From Elizabethan Theatre to the Shakespeare Jubilee (PDF) (Doctoral thesis). King's College London. (Note: "シェイクスピアの正典化における女性の役割――エリザベス朝演劇からシェイクスピア・ジュビリーまで" in Japanese.)
- — (2014). "A Kiss as an Erotic Gift from Cleopatra: Gift-Giving in Antony and Cleopatra". 武蔵大学人文学会. 46 (1): 231–252. hdl:11149/1693.
- — (2017). "トーク&トーク 情報社会から融合社会へ ―仮想と現実が融合する社会での情報のガバナンスと信頼性を考える―" [Talk and Talk]. 情報の科学と技術. 67 (5): 241–250. doi:10.18919/jkg.67.5_241.
- — (21 March 2017). "A Shakespeare of one's own: female users of playbooks from the seventeenth to the mid-eighteenth century". Palgrave Communications. 3 (1). doi:10.1057/palcomms.2017.21.
- — (March 2020). "ウィキペディアにおける女性科学者記事" [Wikipedia articles on women scientists] (PDF). 情報の科学と技術. 70 (3): 127–133. doi:10.18919/jkg.70.3_127.
- — (March 2020). "我々にもオシァン・ジュビリー祭を！ーシェイクスピア・ジュビリー祭と、とあるスコットランドのファンの夢" (PDF). Shakespeare Journal. 6 (59): 11–21. NAID 40022212256.
- — (March 2024). "1960年代の「鏡よ、鏡、鏡さん」 : 寺山修司『毛皮のマリー』と松本俊夫『薔薇の葬列』における『白雪姫』の影響" (PDF). The Journal of Human and Cultural Sciences. 55 (2): 233–252. ISSN 0286-5696.

== Translations ==
- Moran, Caitlin (2018). 女になる方法 ― ロックンロールな13歳のフェミニスト成長記 ― [How to Be a Woman] (in Japanese). Translated by Kitamura Sae. Seidosha. ISBN 978-4-791-77083-0.
- Jenkins, Henry (2021). コンヴァージェンス・カルチャー: ファンとメディアがつくる参加型文化 [Convergence Culture: Where Old and New Media Collide] (in Japanese). Translated by 渡部宏樹; 北村紗衣; 阿部康人. Shobunsha. ISBN 9784794972484.
- "科学、技術と文学" [Science, technology and Literature]. 科学・技術・倫理百科事典 [Encyclopedia of science, technology and ethics]. Maruzen CHI Holdings. 2012. pp. 285–294. ISBN 978-4-621-08387-1.

== Serialisated columns ==
- "あなたの感想って最高ですよね！ 遊びながらやる映画批評". OHTABOOKSTAND. Ohta Publishing.（2024-）
- "素面のダブリン市民". web侃づめ. Kankanbou.（2024-）
- "汗牛充棟だより ヨーロッパ最後の英語圏から". 白水社の本棚. Hakusuisha. （2021-）
- "北村紗衣の記事一覧". ENGLISH JOURNAL. アルク.
- "北村紗衣の記事一覧". wezzy. サイゾー. Archived from the original on 2024-03-29. （2015-2023）
- "北村紗衣の記事一覧". Shūkan Gendai. Kodansha.
- "ウィキペディアとフェミニスト批評". せかいしそう. 世界思想社. 2020. (2020)
