= How to Build a Girl (novel) =

2014 novel by Caitlin Moran

- First edition cover
- Author: Caitlin Moran
- Language: English
- Genre: Coming-of-age; feminist
- Publisher: Ebury Press (UK); HarperCollins (US)
- Publication date: 3 July 2014; 23 September 2014 (US)
- Publication place: United Kingdom
- Media type: Print (hardback, paperback)
- Pages: 352
- ISBN: 978-0-091-94088-1

How to Build a Girl is a 2014 coming-of-age novel by English author and journalist Caitlin Moran, published by Ebury Press.

The novel is semi-autobiographical, with protagonist Johanna Morrigan having a similar upbringing to Moran with a large working-class family on a council estate in Wolverhampton. The novel follows Johanna on her journey to becoming Dolly Wilde, a music journalist, growing up and discovering her sexuality.

The sequel to How to Build a Girl was published in 2018, titled How to Be Famous.

== Plot ==
How to Build a Girl follows Johanna Morrigan, a working-class 14-year-old living with her parents and five siblings on a council estate in 1990s Wolverhampton.

After revealing to her disapproving elderly neighbour, Violet, that her father is on disability benefits, Johanna lives in fear that Violet will report her family to social services which will stop their benefits. Racked with guilt, Johanna begins to look for a way that she can help support her family as she waits for the inevitable letter to tell the Morrigans that their benefits have been suspended while under investigation. Johanna briefly attempts to be a cleaner, and fails to secure a paper round, but finally hits upon a writing competition with a prize of £250 which she wins with a poem. After appearing on a local television show to read out her winning poem and behaving embarrassingly due to nerves, Johanna decides that she must reinvent herself and begins on her path to becoming Dolly Wilde.

Two years later and Johanna has become Dolly Wilde, and sends one music review a day to the Disc & Music Echo. It pays off, as Dolly is invited to the D&ME offices and is given a music journalist job. As her career as a journalist progresses, Dolly decides that it is time to drop out of school to focus fully on her job, leading to conflict between her mother and father who disagree as to whether she is making the right choice. Ultimately she does not go back to school, and is offered a writing job involving a trip to Dublin where she meets musician John Kite.

Dolly meets John Kite in Dublin to interview him, and the pair instantly bond. After returning from John's gig to the hotel in order to conduct the interview, the pair end up staying awake and talking for the entire night. Upon returning to Wolverhampton the next day, Dolly remains infatuated and the pair exchange letters. Dolly's newfound love of John Kite has negative consequences however, as after her gushing review on John's Dublin gig is published in the D&ME, Kenny the editor stops calling offering more work and shortly after Dolly discovers her distraught parents and is informed by her brother Krissi that their benefits have been cut.

Finally, Kenny calls again and Dolly returns to London. The D&ME staff tell her how they had been disappointed with the "fannish" nature of her John Kite review but this is soon disregarded as Dolly accompanies the others to the pub and starts to drink for the first time. She is persuaded to come to a party where she reunites with John Kite, and they share a brief kiss.

After meeting D&ME's star writer Tony Rich and the criticism of her John Kite review, Dolly takes a new approach towards her reviews where she is cuttingly mean about every band she reviews. This proves popular and leads to an increase in work, as well as her growing reputation. However, her new meaner style has consequences as she starts to be confronted at gigs by angry fans of the bands that she ridicules in her reviews and this leads her to start to think that this isn't how she wants to be known for. There is a tipping point in a review where Kenny says that Dolly has finally gone too far, and Dolly has a crisis over what her two years at the D&ME have resulted in. She self harms but her brother Krissi intervenes and looks after her. Krissi and her colleague ZZ take her to a Take That concert to show her how to enjoy music again.

The story concludes with Dolly vowing to reinvent herself once again and throw away all of the aspects of herself that she had grown to hate, and making the decision to move to London to work on her journalism full-time. She also shares a phone call with John Kite, who – after their awkward last meeting – tells her that one day it will all be okay, but for now she is just too young.

== Sequel ==
How to Build a Girl is the first part of a planned trilogy; the second installment entitled How to Be Famous was published on 28 June 2018 by Ebury Press. The unreleased third novel in the trilogy is due to be called How to Change the World.

How to Be Famous follows Dolly after her move to London, dealing with sexism in the music industry during Britpop, and the development of her relationship with John Kite.

== Film adaptation ==
A film version of How to Build a Girl starring Beanie Feldstein and Alfie Allen was released by Lionsgate, produced by Alison Owen and Debra Hayward and their company Monumental Pictures alongside Film4. Moran was involved in the film adaptation as one of the executive producers, as well as co-writing the film with John Niven. The film was released on 7 September 2019 at the Toronto International Film Festival.

== Response ==
Many reviews speak positively of Moran's humour, as well as the openness of Johanna's character. One The Guardian reviewer said, "I adore Caitlin Moran and her honest and hilarious writing style"

The Independent gave Moran a mixed review for How to Build a Girl praising the heart of the novel but criticising the humour in places, ultimately saying, "This isn't a sleek, slick novel, but it is a rambunctious, raw-edged, silly-profound and deeply relatable guide to what your worst mistakes can teach you, and it has much to offer teenagers both actual and inner."

The novel has sometimes been criticised for the overlap between Moran and Johanna's voice. Despite denying that it is autobiographical, Johanna's upbringing is similar to Moran's and some reviews say that sometimes it can become blurred whether the voice is Morrigan or Moran. Barbara Ellen's Guardian review stated, "In particular, the overlap between Moran's voice in HTBAW and Johanna's in HTBAG is sometimes too acute".
