= Beanie Feldstein =

American actress (born 1993)

- Feldstein in 2026
- Born: Elizabeth Greer Feldstein; June 24, 1993 (age 33); Los Angeles, California, U.S.
- Education: Wesleyan University (BA)
- Occupation: Actress
- Years active: 2002–present
- Spouse: Bonnie-Chance Roberts (m. 2023)
- Children: 1
- Relatives: Jonah Hill (brother)

Elizabeth Greer "Beanie" Feldstein (born June 24, 1993) is an American actress. She first gained recognition for her starring roles in the comedy film Neighbors 2: Sorority Rising (2016), the comedy-drama film Lady Bird (2017), and the coming-of-age comedy film Booksmart (2019), the last of which earned her a nomination for the Golden Globe Award for Best Actress in a Motion Picture–Comedy or Musical.

Feldstein has appeared on the Broadway stage, making her debut as Minnie Fay in Hello, Dolly! (2017–18), and portraying the lead role of Fanny Brice in the first revival of Funny Girl (2022), a performance for which she earned a nomination for the Drama League Award for Distinguished Performance. In 2021, she portrayed Monica Lewinsky in the third season of the FX anthology series Impeachment: American Crime Story.

== Early life and education ==
Feldstein was born in Los Angeles, the only daughter of Sharon Lyn (née Chalkin), a costume designer and fashion stylist, and Richard Feldstein, a tour accountant for Guns N' Roses. She is Jewish, and the youngest of three children in her family; her older brother is actor Jonah Hill, and their oldest brother, Maroon 5 manager Jordan Feldstein (1977–2017), died suddenly of a blood clot at age 40.

Her nanny nicknamed her "Beanie" when she was an infant, and her brothers also called her by the name at the time. She attended the Harvard-Westlake School in Los Angeles as well as Stagedoor Manor, a theatre camp in New York. She and fellow Broadway and film actor Ben Platt have been best friends since high school.

She graduated from Wesleyan University in 2015 with a degree in sociology.

== Career ==
Feldstein made her acting debut in 2002, appearing in the ABC comedy series My Wife and Kids. In 2012, she played Megan in the musical television pilot Madison High. In 2015, Feldstein appeared as a guest in the third season of Netflix's comedy series Orange Is the New Black. In the same year she played the role of Anna in the comedy film Fan Girl.

Feldstein received recognition with a more significant role in the comedy film Neighbors 2: Sorority Rising, alongside Seth Rogen and Zac Efron. The film was released on May 20, 2016. She was cast as Lydia Harris in HBO's period drama pilot The Devil You Know. She guest starred in an episode of the NBC sitcom Will & Grace.

On October 18, 2016, Feldstein's casting as Minnie Fay in the 2017 Broadway revival of Hello, Dolly!, starring Bette Midler as Dolly Levi, was announced. Feldstein made her Broadway debut in the role. The show began previews on March 15, 2017, and opened on April 20, 2017. Feldstein's performance was positively received by critics.

Feldstein starred in Whitney Cummings' directorial debut comedy film The Female Brain, which premiered at the LA Film Festival in June 2017. She co-starred alongside Saoirse Ronan and Laurie Metcalf in Greta Gerwig's solo directorial debut, Lady Bird, which was released to critical acclaim in 2017. The film earned a nomination for the Academy Award for Best Picture. Along with the cast, she was nominated for the Screen Actors Guild Award for Outstanding Performance by a Cast in a Motion Picture.

Feldstein with her Booksmart co-stars Billie Lourd (far left) and Kaitlin Dever at SXSW in 2019.

In 2019, Feldstein had a recurring role as Jenna in the first season of the television horror comedy series What We Do in the Shadows, an adaptation of the film of the same title. Her performance earned positive reviews from critics. She was not able to return for the second season, as was originally planned, due to other filming commitments. Also in 2019, she starred in Olivia Wilde's directorial debut, the high school comedy Booksmart. Her performance garnered widespread critical acclaim and a nomination for the Golden Globe Award for Best Actress – Motion Picture Comedy or Musical. She later portrayed the British lead character Johanna Morrigan in the coming-of-age comedy film How to Build a Girl, which was an adaptation of Caitlin Moran's 2014 novel of the same title. The film and her performance garnered positive reviews from critics.

In 2020, she guest starred as Tess Anderson in the ABC medical drama series Grey's Anatomy. Feldstein stated that it had been a dream of hers to appear on the series since she was a child. She voiced a role in The Simpsons, featuring as a support group therapist in the episode "Frinkcoin". She appeared in the television specials Saturday Night Seder and Take Me to the World: A Sondheim 90th Celebration, performing a cover of "It Takes Two" from Into the Woods with Ben Platt on the latter program.

Feldstein starred in the drama film The Humans, based on Stephen Karam's one-act play of the same title.

On August 6, 2019, it was announced that she would star as Monica Lewinsky in the third season of American Crime Story, subtitled Impeachment. On August 29, 2019, it was announced that Feldstein would be starring in Richard Linklater's film adaptation of Merrily We Roll Along, which would be shot over the course of twenty years. Principal photography of the first section of the film has already been completed. Feldstein is set to star alongside Ben Platt and Paul Mescal.

On August 11, 2021, it was announced that she would star as Fanny Brice in the 2022 Broadway revival of Funny Girl. Reviews of her performance were mixed to negative. Jesse Green at The New York Times called her "good" but "not stupendous," while Adrian Horton at The Guardian opined that Feldstein "simply isn't" a "power singer." Johnny Oleksinski of The New York Post remarked that "Feldstein is, I'm sorry to say, not giving a Broadway-caliber performance." Feldstein subsequently left the production and was later replaced by Lea Michele on September 6, 2022.

In September 2022, Feldstein was cast in Ethan Coen's Drive-Away Dolls. She joined the cast of Only Murders in the Building in its fifth season.

== Personal life ==
Feldstein is queer. She met English film producer Bonnie-Chance Roberts on the set of the 2019 film How to Build a Girl. The two were engaged in June 2022 and married on May 19, 2023. In May 2026, Feldstein announced she was pregnant with her and Roberts's first child.

== Filmography ==
Key
†	Denotes films that have not yet been released

=== Film ===
Year	Title	Role	Notes
2015	Fan Girl	Anna	
2016	Neighbors 2: Sorority Rising	Nora Clerk	
2017	The Female Brain	Abby	
2017	Lady Bird	Julianne "Julie" Steffans	
2019	Booksmart	Molly Davidson	
2019	How to Build a Girl	Johanna Morrigan	
2020	Ben Platt Live from Radio City Music Hall	Herself	
2021	The Humans	Brigid	
2024	Drive-Away Dolls	Sukie	
2026	Tangles	Hannah (voice)	
2026	The End of It	AI Assistant	
2026	Focker-in-Law	Samantha Focker	
TBA	Merrily We Roll Along †	Mary Flynn	Filming

=== Television ===
Year	Title	Role	Notes
2002	My Wife and Kids	Beanie	Episode: "Crouching Mother, Hidden Father"
2012	Madison High	Marty	Unsold television pilot
2015	Orange Is the New Black	2004 Party Girl	Episode: "Where My Dreidel At"
2015	The Devil You Know	Lydia Harris	Episode: "Pilot"
2017	Will & Grace	Stella	Episode: "Who's Your Daddy", uncredited
2019	What We Do in the Shadows	Jenna	4 episodes
2020	The Simpsons	Support Group Therapist (voice)	Episode: "Frinkcoin"
2020	Grey's Anatomy	Tess Desmond	Episode: "Snowblind"
2020	Saturday Night Seder	Herself	Television special
2020	Take Me to the World: A Sondheim 90th Celebration	Herself / Performer	Television special
2020	Home Movie: The Princess Bride	Princess Buttercup	Episode: "Chapter Eight: Ultimate Suffering"
2020	Make It Work!	Herself	Television special
2021	Impeachment: American Crime Story	Monica Lewinsky	Main role; also producer
2021–2023	Harriet the Spy	Harriet M. Welsch (voice)	Main role; 20 episodes
2024	Life & Beth	Therapist	Episode: "This Soup Is Gonna Be Good"
2025	Match Game	Herself	2 episodes
2025	Only Murders in the Building	Althea	Recurring role; 6 episodes
2026	Elsbeth	Rachel Withers	Episode: "Otherwise Enraged"
2026	Sofia the First: Royal Magic	Wildfyre (voice)	Recurring role

=== Music videos ===
Year	Title	Artist(s)	Role	Ref.
2018	"Girls Like You" (Original, Volume 2 and Vertical Video versions)	Maroon 5 featuring Cardi B	Herself	
2019	"Woman"	Karen O and Danger Mouse	Dancer	

=== Stage ===
Year	Title	Role	Venue	Notes	Ref.
2004	Annie	Kate	La Mirada Theatre	Regional	
2017–2018	Hello, Dolly!	Minnie Fay	Shubert Theatre	Broadway	
2022	Funny Girl	Fanny Brice	August Wilson Theatre	Broadway	
2024	The 25th Annual Putnam County Spelling Bee	Logainne SchwartzandGrubenierre	The Kennedy Center	Regional	

== Awards and nominations ==
Year	Award	Category	Work	Result	Ref.
2018	Actor Award	Outstanding Performance by a Cast in a Motion Picture	Lady Bird	Nominated	
2018	Online Film & Television Association Award	Best Ensemble	Lady Bird	Won	
2019	Online Film & Television Association Award	Best Guest Actress in a Comedy Series	What We Do in the Shadows	Nominated	
2019	IndieWire Critics Poll Award	Best Actress	Booksmart	Nominated	
2019	CinemaCon Award	Female Stars of Tomorrow (shared with Kaitlyn Dever)	Booksmart	Won	
2019	Hollywood Critics Association Award	Best Actress	Booksmart	Runner-up	
2020	Golden Schmoes Award	Breakthrough Performance of the Year	Booksmart	Nominated	
2020	Queerty Award	Film Performance	Booksmart	Nominated	
2020	Online Film & Television Association Award	Best Breakthrough Performance: Female	Booksmart	Nominated	
2020	Dorian Award	Rising Star of the Year	Booksmart	Nominated	
2020	Santa Barbara International Film Festival	Virtuoso Award	Booksmart	Won	
2020	Golden Globe Award	Best Actress – Motion Picture Comedy or Musical	Booksmart	Nominated	
2022	Drama League Award	Distinguished Performance	Funny Girl	Nominated	
2022	Broadway.com Audience Awards	Favorite Leading Actress in a Musical	Funny Girl	Nominated	
2022	Broadway.com Audience Awards	Favorite Funny Performance	Funny Girl	Nominated	
2022	Broadway.com Audience Awards	Favorite Diva Performance	Funny Girl	Nominated	
2022	Broadway.com Audience Awards	Favorite Breakthrough Performance (Female)	Funny Girl	Won	
2022	Satellite Award	Best Actress - Television Series Drama	Impeachment: American Crime Story	Nominated	
2026	Actor Award	Outstanding Performance by an Ensemble in a Comedy Series	Only Murders in the Building	Nominated	
