= How to Build a Girl =

2019 American-British comedy film

- Theatrical release poster
- Directed by: Coky Giedroyc
- Screenplay by: Caitlin Moran
- Based on: How to Build a Girl by Caitlin Moran
- Produced by: Alison Owen; Debra Hayward
- Starring: Beanie Feldstein; Paddy Considine; Sarah Solemani; Alfie Allen; Frank Dillane; Laurie Kynaston; Arinzé Kene; Tadhg Murphy; Ziggy Heath; Bobby Schofield; Chris O'Dowd; Joanna Scanlan; Emma Thompson
- Cinematography: Hubert Taczanowski
- Edited by: Gary Dollner; Gareth C. Scales
- Music by: Oli Julian
- Production companies: Film4; Tango Entertainment; Protagonist Pictures; Monumental Pictures
- Distributed by: Lionsgate Prime Video (United Kingdom); IFC Films (United States)
- Release dates: 7 September 2019 (TIFF); 8 May 2020 (United States); 24 July 2020 (United Kingdom)
- Running time: 102 minutes
- Countries: United Kingdom; United States
- Language: English
- Box office: $70,632

How to Build a Girl is a 2019 coming-of-age comedy film directed by Coky Giedroyc, from a screenplay by Caitlin Moran, based on her 2014 novel. The film tells the story of Johanna Morrigan, an aspiring music journalist in 1990s Wolverhampton. It stars Beanie Feldstein, Paddy Considine, Sarah Solemani, Alfie Allen, Frank Dillane, Laurie Kynaston, Arinzé Kene, Tadhg Murphy, Ziggy Heath, Bobby Schofield, Chris O'Dowd, Joanna Scanlan and Emma Thompson.

How to Build a Girl had its world premiere at the Toronto International Film Festival on 7 September 2019 and won the FIPRESCI Special Presentations award. The film was released in the United States on 8 May 2020 by IFC Films and in the United Kingdom on 24 July 2020 by Lionsgate.

== Plot ==
In 1993, 16-year-old Johanna Morrigan lives on a council estate in Wolverhampton with her aspiring rock star father Pat, exhausted mother Angie, brothers Krissi and Lupin, and two infant twins.

Johanna dreams of escaping her life to become a writer, and finds comfort in speaking with the portraits of her idols covering her bedroom wall. A poem she wrote is selected for a televised competition, but she is overcome with nerves and humiliates herself on national television. After inadvertently revealing that her family is illegally breeding Border Collies, resulting in her father losing his disability benefits, Johanna is determined to earn money for the family.

Krissi refers her to D&ME, a London music paper seeking a rock critic, and Johanna submits a review of the Annie soundtrack. She is invited to interview at the D&ME offices, but arrives to learn the staff assumed her submission was a joke. Undeterred, she convinces them to give her a chance, so is assigned to cover the Manic Street Preachers in Birmingham.

Eager to reinvent herself, Johanna adopts a new style, bright red hair, and the pen name "Dolly Wilde". She attends her first rock show and falls in love with the music, immersing herself in the local scene.

D&ME agrees to send her to Dublin to interview musician John Kite, who is instantly smitten with her bubbly personality. She spends the day with John, who brings her onstage with him. Afterward, they open up to one another about their lives, and Johanna finds herself enamored with him.

Returning home, Johanna writes a glowing feature on John, which her editor dismisses as the work of a teenage girl with a crush. Realising that negative criticism is the path to success, she begins writing deliberately cruel reviews as Dolly.

Now a scathing but popular critic, Johanna is able to support her family with her writing income. She becomes sexually active, forcing Krissi to listen as she recounts her sexual exploits. Pat, still hoping to achieve fame with his band Mayonnaise, gives his single to Johanna to promote. She brings it to a D&ME gathering where it is derided by the others, who force her to skeet shoot the record.

At a music industry event, Johanna receives an award for "Arsehole of the Year", and runs into John. She drunkenly confesses her feelings for him and tries to kiss him, but he kindly rejects her advances.

The next morning, Johanna writes a piece about his life, including deeply personal details he told her in confidence. She quits school, leading her parents and Krissi to confront her over her increasingly delinquent behaviour, but she cruelly reminds them that her money is supporting the family.

Johanna goes to a party with her coworkers, where she accepts a full-time position at D&ME, but overhears them badmouthing her. Unleashing a tirade against their smugness and negativity, she quits and returns home to find John has called about her article, ending their friendship.

Distraught, Johanna drinks and cuts her wrist with a drawing compass, but is knocked unconscious when her "Arsehole" award falls on her head. Recovering at the hospital, she reconciles with her family.

To make amends, Johanna tries to apologise to every musician she criticised. She writes a piece on self-harm, and is hired by The Face magazine to write her own column, "Building a Girl".

Finding John, Johanna apologises for her article, and shows him her original writing about him. She also gives him her newly cut-off hair as a token of apology. John forgives her, and says that while they may not be in a relationship anytime soon, he is happy to be her friend. Breaking the fourth wall, Johanna tells the audience that a girl can always reinvent herself for the better.

== Cast ==
- Beanie Feldstein as Johanna Morrigan, aka Dolly
- Alfie Allen as John Kite
- Paddy Considine as Pat Morrigan
- Sarah Solemani as Angie Morrigan
- Laurie Kynaston as Krissi Morrigan
- Joanna Scanlan as Mrs Belling
- Arinzé Kene as Kenny
- Frank Dillane as Tony Rich
- Jameela Jamil as Cleopatra
- Tadhg Murphy as Andy Rock
- Ziggy Heath as Derby
- Emma Thompson as Amanda Watson
- Chris O'Dowd as Alan Wilko Wilkinson
- Dónal Finn as Karl Boden
- Edward Bluemel as Strange Cages Manager
- Hammed Animashaun as Ed Edwards
- Michael Sheen as Sigmund Freud
- Lucy Punch as Sylvia Plath
- Sharon Horgan as Jo March
- Gemma Arterton as Maria von Trapp
- Lily Allen as Elizabeth Taylor
- Alexei Sayle as Karl Marx
- Andi Oliver as Donna Summer
- Mel Giedroyc as Charlotte Brontë
- Sue Perkins as Emily Brontë
- Patsy Ferran as Snow Pixie (aka Bjork)
- Bobby Schofield as Pricey
- Bob Mortimer as Awards Host
- Evan Kenneth Jones as Charlie

== Production ==
In November 2014, it was announced Alison Owen and Debra Hayward had acquired rights to the novel of the same by Caitlin Moran, who also wrote the script for the film. Owens and Hayward produced the film under their Monumental Pictures banner, along with Film4 Productions. In May 2018, Beanie Feldstein joined the cast of the film, with Tango Entertainment producing and financing the film. In June 2018, Alfie Allen joined the cast of the film. In July 2018, Paddy Considine, Sarah Solemani, Laurie Kynaston, Joanna Scanlan, Arinze Kene, Frank Dillane, Tadhg Murphy and Ziggy Heath joined the cast of the film. Daniel Battsek, Ollie Madden, Sue Bruce-Smith, Tim Headington, Lisa Buman, Zygi Kamasa, Emma Berkofsky and Caitlin Moran will executive produce the film under their Film4 Productions and Tango Entertainment banners, respectively. Lionsgate will distribute in the United Kingdom. In August 2018, Jameela Jamil joined the cast of the film. In October 2018, Emma Thompson and Chris O'Dowd joined the cast of the film.

=== Filming ===
Principal photography began on 16 July 2018. The school scenes were filmed on the premises of Meadhurst Primary School, London.

== Release ==
The film had its world premiere at the Toronto International Film Festival on 7 September 2019. In November 2019, IFC Films acquired North American distribution rights to the film. It was released in the United States on 8 May 2020. Originally intended to receive a theatrical release in the United Kingdom, Lionsgate decided to release it straight to streaming as an Amazon Original on Prime Video on 24 July 2020.

== Reception ==
=== Box office ===
In its opening weekend on the US, the film grossed $15,000 from six theatres. In its second weekend, it made $36,000 from nine drive-in cinemas, for a 10-day total of $55,802.

=== Critical response ===
On Rotten Tomatoes, the film has an approval rating of 79% based on 139 reviews, with an average rating of 6.6/10. The site's critical consensus reads: "Led by Beanie Feldstein's charming performance, How to Build a Girl puts a disarmingly earnest spin on the familiar coming-of-age comedy formula." On Metacritic, the film has a weighted average score of 69 out of 100, based on 26 critics, indicating "generally favorable" reviews.

Ann Hornaday of The Washington Post wrote: "To every girl who watched Almost Famous and High Fidelity and bears the scars of trying to shoehorn her inner self into the male protagonist's cramped psyche, How to Build a Girl arrives like a soothing, if imperfect, balm."
