= Ziggy Heath =

British-Polish actor and writer

- Born: Zygmunt Lawrence Giedroyc Heath
- Education: University of York, London Academy of Music and Dramatic Art
- Occupations: Actor, writer
- Years active: 2013–present
- Spouse: Jessica Brown Findlay (m. 2020)
- Children: 2

Zygmunt Lawrence Giedroyc Heath is a British-Polish actor and writer.

== Early life and education ==
Heath was born in west London to what he has described as a traditional Polish Catholic family. He was christened Zygmunt to have a traditional Polish name but it was shortened to Ziggy, in part because his parents are both fans of David Bowie. He graduated from London Academy of Music and Dramatic Art.

== Career ==
=== Theatre ===
Heath made his professional stage debut playing the lead role of Hon. Alan Howard in a production of the Terence Rattigan play French Without Tears at the Orange Tree Theatre in 2016. He also played Man in the two-hander In the Night Time (Before the Sun Rises) at the Orange Tree Theatre in 2018. In 2019 he played the titular role of Peter Pan in a production of Ella Hickson's Wendy and Peter Pan at the Royal Lyceum Theatre, directed by Eleanor Rhode, with the show going on to receive outstanding critical reviews. In June 2024, it was announced that Heath would play Oleg Sogolyev in the world premiere of David Edgar's new play The New Real at the RSC.

=== Film and television ===
Heath played the role of Kazimir in British television series Spies of Warsaw, and made his feature film debut alongside Andrew Scott in Mick Jackson's film Denial. Heath then played Derby in the Caitlin Moran-written 2019 film How to Build a Girl. He played Sam Holland in the period drama Harlots inspired by The Covent Garden Ladies by British historian Hallie Rubenhold. He played Jack Philips in the adaptation of Jessie Burton's best selling novel The Miniaturist, and played Luke Harris in the Cold Feet revival. He also appeared in the Black Mirror episode "Hated in the Nation".

He portrayed the younger version of Kindertransport humanitarian Martin Blake in the 2023 film One Life, with Jonathan Pryce playing the older version. The film went on to close the Toronto International Film Festival, receiving excellent reviews. He appeared as Mark in the 2023 film Greatest Days and plays the role of Peggy Bettinson in the Steven Knight historical drama A Thousand Blows.

== Personal life ==
Heath met Jessica Brown Findlay on the set of Harlots. The pair married in September 2020, their initially planned wedding having been postponed due to the COVID-19 pandemic. Their twin sons were born on 5 November 2022.

== Filmography ==
=== Film ===
Year	Title	Role	Notes
2016	Denial	Gerald	
2019	How to Build a Girl	Derby	
2023	Greatest Days	Mark	
2023	One Life	Martin Blake	
2027	Girls on the Floor †	Charlie	Filming
TBA	Plough Lane †	--	Writer

=== Television ===
Year	Title	Role	Notes
2013	Spies of Warsaw	Kazimir	3 episodes
2013	What Remains	Alex Harper	3 episodes
2016	Black Mirror	MRI	Episode: "Hated in the Nation"
2017	Cold Feet	Luke Harris	3 episodes
2017	The Miniaturist	Jack Phillips	3 episodes
2017–2018	Harlots	Sam Holland	5 episodes
2020	Father Brown	Teddy Neville-Crowley	1 episode
2021	I Am….	Andrew	Episode: "I Am...Maria"
2025	A Thousand Blows	Peggy Bettinson	5 episodes

== Theatre ==
Year	Title	Role	Director	Playwright	Theatre
2016	French Without Tears	Hon. Alan Howard	Paul Miller	Terrence Rattigan	Orange Tree Theatre
2018	In The Night Time	Man	Evie Cullingworth	Nina Segal	Orange Tree Theatre
2019	Wendy and Peter Pan	Peter Pan	Eleanor Rhode	Ella Hickson	Royal Lyceum Theatre
2024	The New Real	Oleg Sogolyev	Holly Race Roughan	David Edgar	The Other Place, RSC
2025	Scenes From The Climate Era	A	Atri Banerjee	David Finnigan	Gate Theatre
2026	Driftwood	Tom	Justin Audibert	Martina Laird	The Other Place, RSC
2026	Driftwood	Tom	Justin Audibert	Martina Laird	Kiln Theatre
