= San Diego Film Critics Society Award for Best Performance by an Ensemble =

Annual US film award

The San Diego Film Critics Society Award for Best Performance by an Ensemble (formerly for Best Cast) is an annual film award given by the San Diego Film Critics Society.

== Winners ==
=== 2000s ===
Year	Winner	Cast members
2006	Babel	Adriana Barraza, Cate Blanchett, Gael García Bernal, Rinko Kikuchi, Brad Pitt, and Kōji Yakusho
2007	No Country for Old Men	Javier Bardem, Josh Brolin, Garret Dillahunt, Tess Harper, Woody Harrelson, Tommy Lee Jones, and Kelly Macdonald
2008	Frost/Nixon	Kevin Bacon, Rebecca Hall, Toby Jones, Frank Langella, Matthew Macfadyen, Oliver Platt, Sam Rockwell, and Michael Sheen
2009	Inglourious Basterds	Daniel Brühl, August Diehl, Julie Dreyfus, Michael Fassbender, Sylvester Groth, Jacky Ido, Diane Kruger, Mélanie Laurent, Denis Menochet, Mike Myers, Brad Pitt, Eli Roth, Til Schweiger, Rod Taylor, Christoph Waltz, and Martin Wuttke

=== 2010s ===
Year	Winner	Cast members
2010	44 Inch Chest	Stephen Dillane, John Hurt, Ian McShane, Melvil Poupaud, Joanne Whalley, Tom Wilkinson, and Ray Winstone
2011	Harry Potter and the Deathly Hallows – Part 2	Helena Bonham Carter, David Bradley, Jim Broadbent, Robbie Coltrane, Warwick Davis, Tom Felton, Ralph Fiennes, Michael Gambon, Domhnall Gleeson, Rupert Grint, George Harris, Ciarán Hinds, John Hurt, Jason Isaacs, Gemma Jones, Dave Legeno, Matthew Lewis, Evanna Lynch, Kelly Macdonald, Miriam Margolyes, Helen McCrory, Nick Moran, Gary Oldman, James Phelps, Oliver Phelps, Clémence Poésy, Daniel Radcliffe, Alan Rickman, Maggie Smith, Natalia Tena, David Thewlis, Emma Thompson, Julie Walters, Emma Watson, Mark Williams, and Bonnie Wright
2012	The Perks of Being a Wallflower	Brian Balzerini, Nicholas Braun, Joan Cusack, Nina Dobrev, Adam Hagenbuch, Logan Lerman, Melanie Lynskey, Dylan McDermott, Ezra Miller, Paul Rudd, Tom Savini, Johnny Simmons, Tom Kruszewski, Reece Thompson, Kate Walsh, Emma Watson, Mae Whitman, and Erin Wilhelmi
2013	American Hustle	Amy Adams, Christian Bale, Bradley Cooper, Robert De Niro, Jack Huston, Jennifer Lawrence, Alessandro Nivola, Michael Peña, Elisabeth Röhm, Jeremy Renner, and Shea Whigham
2014	Birdman or (The Unexpected Virtue of Ignorance)	Michael Keaton, Zach Galifianakis, Edward Norton, Andrea Riseborough, Amy Ryan, Emma Stone, Naomi Watts, Merritt Wever, Lindsay Duncan, and Jeremy Shamos
2015	What We Do in the Shadows	Jemaine Clement, Rhys Darby, and Taika Waititi
2016	Hell or High Water	Chris Pine, Jeff Bridges, Ben Foster, Dale Dickey, Gil Birmingham, Marin Ireland, Katy Mixon, Melanie Papalia, and Kevin Rankin
2017	Mudbound	Jonathan Banks, Mary J. Blige, Jason Clarke, Garrett Hedlund, Jason Mitchell, Rob Morgan, and Carey Mulligan
2018	Game Night	Jason Bateman, Rachel McAdams, Billy Magnussen, Sharon Horgan, Lamorne Morris, Kylie Bunbury, Jesse Plemons, Michael C. Hall, and Kyle Chandler
2019	Knives Out	Ana de Armas, Toni Collette, Daniel Craig, Jamie Lee Curtis, Chris Evans, Don Johnson, Katherine Langford, Riki Lindhome, Jaeden Martell, Edi Patterson, Christopher Plummer, Noah Segan, Michael Shannon, Lakeith Stanfield

=== 2020s ===
Year	Winner	Cast members
2020	One Night in Miami...	Kingsley Ben-Adir, Eli Goree, Aldis Hodge, Leslie Odom, Jr., Lance Reddick, Joaquina Kalukango, Michael Imperioli, Beau Bridges, Lawrence Gilliard, Jr., Nicolette Robinson
2021	Don't Look Up	Cate Blanchett, Timothée Chalamet, Leonardo DiCaprio, Ariana Grande, Jonah Hill, Jennifer Lawrence, Melanie Lynskey, Scott Mescudi, Rob Morgan, Himesh Patel, Ron Perlman, Tyler Perry, Mark Rylance, Meryl Streep
2022	Everything Everywhere All at Once	Jamie Lee Curtis, James Hong, Stephanie Hsu, Ke Huy Quan, Harry Shum Jr., Jenny Slate, Michelle Yeoh
2023	The Holdovers	Paul Giamatti, Da'Vine Joy Randolph, Dominic Sessa, Carrie Preston, Gillian Vigman, Tate Donovan, Brady Hepner, Ian Dolley, Jim Kaplan, Michael Provost, Andrew Garman
2024	September 5	Peter Sarsgaard, John Magaro, Ben Chaplin, Leonie Benesch
2025	Black Bag	Cate Blanchett, Michael Fassbender, Marisa Abela, Tom Burke, Naomie Harris, Regé-Jean Page, Gustaf Skarsgård, Kae Alexander, Ambika Mod
