= What About Men? =

2023 book

- Author: Caitlin Moran
- Publisher: Ebury Publishing
- Publication date: 6 July 2023
- Media type: Hardcover
- Pages: 320
- ISBN: 978-1-52-914915-9

What About Men? is a book by feminist author Caitlin Moran published in 2023. The book discusses the effects of pornography use in men, and the interest in Andrew Tate from adolescent boys.

== Reception ==
Writing in The Daily Telegraph, Nina Power comments on Moran not considering other media on the topic including the How to be a Man BBC radio series, and the lack of discussion on the transgender rights movement. Writing in UnHerd, philosopher Kathleen Stock comments that the motivations for writing the book were admirable but the analysis has flaws. Kathleen Stock criticises Moran for presenting homogeneous concepts of masculinity and women's behaviour, and compares all women's behaviour to her own. She disagrees with Moran's dismissal of the potential influence of sex differences in psychology on male and female behaviour. Stock offers an alternative explanation for the popularity of Andrew Tate, arguing that after the MeToo movement there has been a tendency to criticise all men, citing the recent National Rail campaign about intrusive staring as an example, arguing that the simplicity of Tate's messaging is an alternative to un-nuanced messaging. Stock argues that Moran's praise of masculinity is exclusively prosocial and non-threatening to women.

Nina Power likens Moran's position with the concept of the ladette in the United Kingdom, that legitimised women behaving in a similar way to men, arguing that book similarly suggests that men should be able to behave more like women. Stock comments that Moran's solutions to the problems of men and boys are mostly adopting the behaviour of women, and while she feels many aspects of this behaviour may be learned she feels that if there are biological causes in the aggregate such interventions might be ineffective for men.

Stock criticizes Moran's ribald style of writing frequently making jokes about sexual behaviour. Power comments that the book is glib, dated, and insulting.
