= Marisa Abela =

British actress (born 1996)

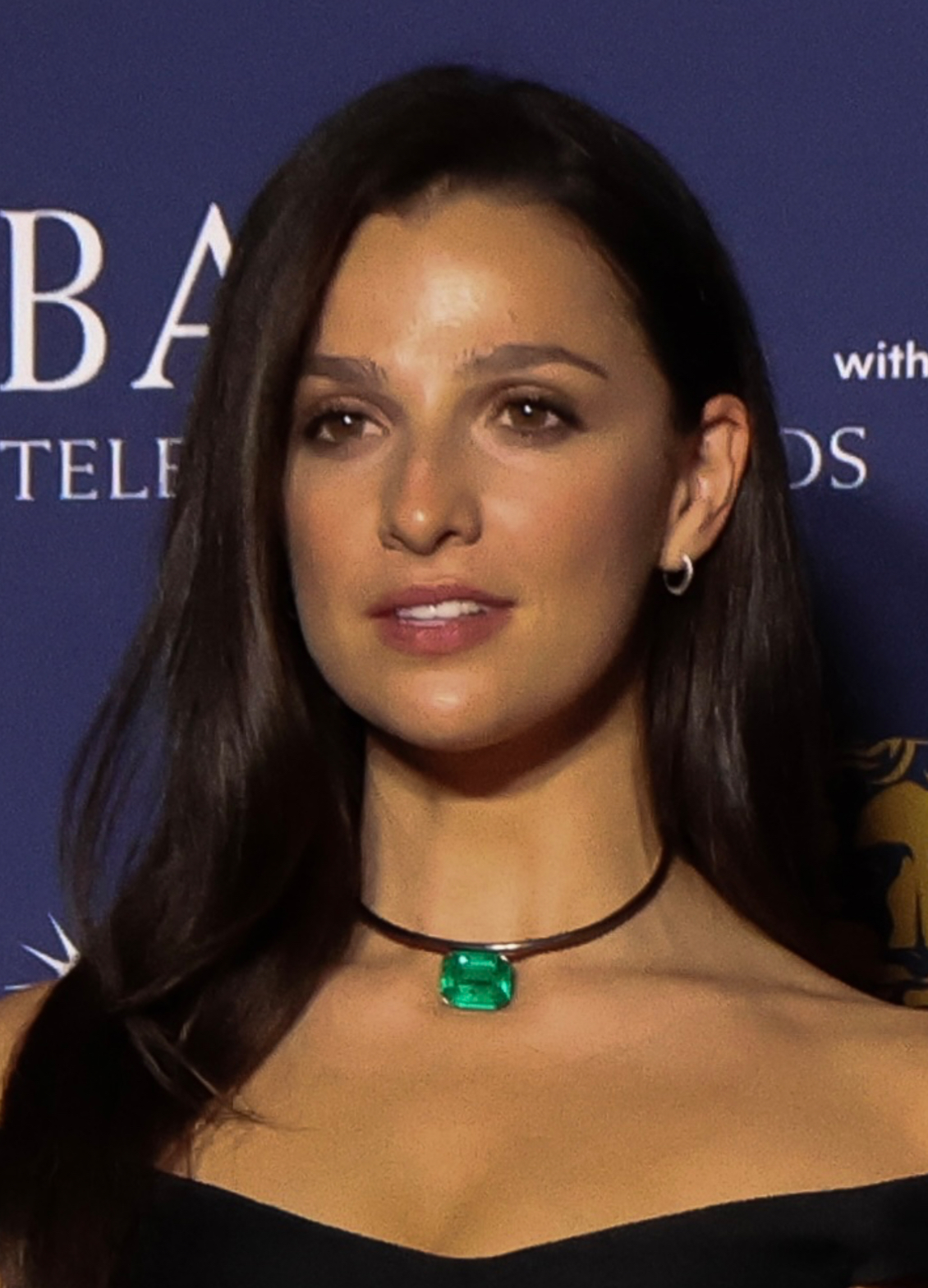
- Abela at the 2026 British Academy Television Awards
- Born: Marisa Gabrielle Abela; 7 December 1996 (age 29); Brighton, East Sussex, England
- Education: Royal Academy of Dramatic Art
- Occupation: Actress
- Years active: 2008–present
- Spouse: Jamie Bogyo (m. 2025)

Marisa Gabrielle Abela (born 7 December 1996) is a British actress. On television, Abela gained prominence through her role in the BBC Two / HBO drama Industry (2020–present), for which she won the British Academy Television Award for Best Actress. She also had a recurring role in the Sky One political thriller COBRA (2020). She portrayed Amy Winehouse in the biographical film Back to Black (2024), and appeared in Steven Soderbergh's spy drama Black Bag (2025). Abela was named a 2023 Screen International Star of Tomorrow and received a nomination for the BAFTA Rising Star Award.

== Early life and education ==
Marisa Gabrielle Abela was born on 7 December 1996 in Brighton to her mother actress Caroline Gruber who is an actress, primarily stage, featuring in many National Theatre productions, and who Abela credits as being a primary inspiration as a young girl, and her father director Angelo Abela and grew up in Rottingdean with her older brother Jack. Her father is of Maltese Libyan descent, and her mother is of Ashkenazi Jewish ancestry. They divorced when Abela was four years old.

She attended Roedean School on a drama scholarship and took drama classes with the Theatre Workshop. She went on to graduate from the Royal Academy of Dramatic Art (RADA) in 2019.

== Career ==
Abela first appeared aged 11 as the character Alice in the thriller Man in a Box (2008). After graduating from RADA, Abela made her television debut in 2020 with main roles in the Sky One political thriller COBRA as Ellie Sutherland. She gained prominence for her role as Yasmin Kara-Hanani in BBC Two and HBO office drama Industry (2020–present). Maddy Mussen of London Evening Standard praised her performance citing her as the "true star of season three" adding, "Any Yasmin naysayers of seasons past will struggle to come out of this season with anything but a profound desire to watch more and more of her character." For her performance in the third season she earned the British Academy Television Award for Best Actress. She appeared in the 2022 films She Is Love and Rogue Agent. In July 2022, Abela joined the cast of Greta Gerwig's Barbie (2023) in a minor supporting role as Teen Talk Barbie.

She next starred as Amy Winehouse in Back to Black (2024), a biopic about the late singer directed by Sam Taylor-Johnson. The film received mixed reviews but Abela's performance received positive notices from critics including Peter Bradshaw of The Guardian who wrote, "Abela conveys her tenderness, and perhaps most poignantly of all her youth, so tellingly at odds with that tough image and eerily mature voice." Damon Wise of Deadline Hollywood wrote, "[Abela] excels when she’s free of delivering expositional biopic dialogue and just being Amy Winehouse". Leslie Felperin cites Abela as the film's highlight citing her "intensely physical performance" adding, "Much of the credit should go to its star Marisa Abela...who manages to project Winehouse’s distinctive blend of fragility, intelligence and cornered-wildcat self-destructiveness". In 2025 she was nominated for the BAFTA Rising Star Award and subsequently won for her performance as Yasmin Kara-Hanani in the drama series Industry. That same year, she appeared in Steven Soderbergh's spy drama Black Bag starring Michael Fassbender and Cate Blanchett.

It was announced that Abela would lend her voice and portray Elizabeth Bennet in new adaptation of Jane Austen's Pride and Prejudice on Audible. She will act alongside Harris Dickinson as Mr. Darcy, Will Poulter as Mr. Wickham, Jessie Buckley as Caroline Bingley, Toheeb Jimoh as Mr. Bingley and Glenn Close as Lady Catherine de Bourgh.

== Personal life ==
In 2020, Abela was diagnosed with thyroid cancer, undergoing an eight-hour operation to remove the tumour followed by radioiodine therapy.

In July 2024, Abela became engaged to actor Jamie Bogyo, whom she had first met while at RADA. They married in September 2025.

== Acting credits ==
=== Film ===
Year	Title	Role	Notes	Ref.
2008	Man in a Box	Alice		
2022	Rogue Agent	Sophie Jones		
2022	She Is Love	Louise		
2023	Barbie	Teen Talk Barbie		
2024	Back to Black	Amy Winehouse		
2025	Black Bag	Clarissa Dubose		
TBA	Highlander †	TBA	Filming	

=== Television ===
Year	Title	Role	Notes	Ref.
2020	COBRA	Ellie Sutherland	Recurring role	
2020–present	Industry	Yasmin Kara-Hanani	Main role	

=== Theatre ===
Year	Title	Role	Playwright	Notes	Ref.
2018	Linda	Alice	Penelope Skinner	Royal Academy of Dramatic Art	
2018	Don Juan Comes Back from the War	Various roles	Ödön von Horváth	Royal Academy of Dramatic Art	

=== Audio ===
Year	Title	Role	Notes	Ref.
2025	Pride and Prejudice	Elizabeth Bennet (voice)	Audible	

== Accolades ==
Award	Year	Category	Work	Result	Ref.
British Academy Film Awards	2025	Rising Star Award	—N/a	Nominated	
British Academy Television Awards	2025	Best Actress	Industry	Won	
London Film Critics' Circle	2025	Breakthrough Performer of the Year	Back to Black	Nominated	
Savannah Film Festival	2024	Next Gen Award	—N/a	Won	
