= Stacey Ferreira =

American entrepreneur, speaker and author

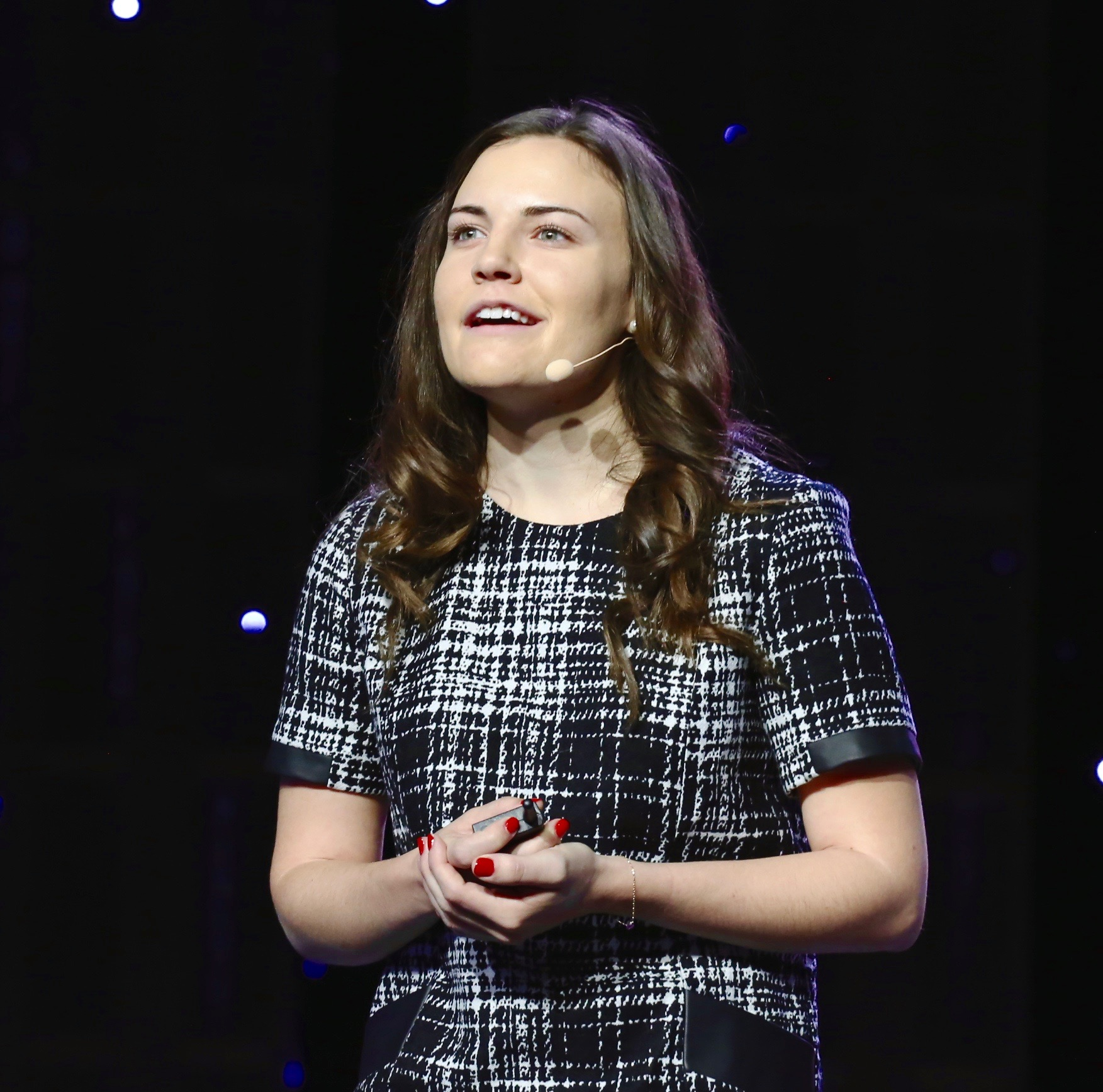
- Born: September 11, 1992 (age 34); Scottsdale, AZ
- Education: NYU's Gallatin School (2011–2012), (2014–2015)
- Occupations: Co-Founder & CEO of Forge; Co-Founder of MySocialCloud; Co-Author of 2 Billion Under 20
- Relatives: Scott Ferreira
- Awards: Thiel Fellow 2015; Forbes 30 Under 30
- Website: staceyferreira.com

Stacey Ferreira (born September 11, 1992) is an American entrepreneur, speaker and author. She is the former co-founder and CEO of Forge. Today, she is at Ford, serving as their Director of Retail Execution and Innovation for the Model e.

Ferreira also co-founded the online bookmark vault and password manager MySocialCloud.com with her brother Scott Ferreira. MySocialCloud investors include Richard Branson, Jerry Murdock, and Alex Welch. In 2016, she was added to Forbes's 30 under 30 list.

== Early life and education ==
Ferreira was born on September 11, 1992, in Scottsdale, Arizona. Her mother, Patricia Ferreira, worked in accounting for IBM and later became an accountant at the State of Arizona. Her father, Victor Ferreira, is a Vice President of Sales at IBM.

She attended Xavier College Preparatory in Phoenix, AZ, to complete her high school degree. She served as a Board Member for the nonprofit Open Table, which her brother cofounded, when she was 11. She also worked at a local Phoenix educational TV station and attended GRAMMY Camp.

After founding MySocialCloud, Stacey attended New York University’s Steinhardt School of Culture, Education, and Human Development to study Music Business. After one year, she took a leave of absence to pursue MySocialCloud full-time.

== Career ==
=== MySocialCloud ===
Ferreira co-founded MySocialCloud with her brother, Scott Ferreira, and programmer, Shiv Prakash, while she was in high school. The idea came after a computer crash that left Scott without the spreadsheet he used to store usernames and passwords for his online accounts. In 2013, the siblings sold MySocialCloud to Reputation.com and moved from Los Angeles to the San Francisco Bay Area.

=== Writing ===
After selling MySocialCloud, Ferreira worked with Jared Kleinert to co-author 2 Billion Under 20: How Millennials Are Breaking Down Age Barriers And Changing The World. The book rose to the #1 New Release position in the Business Leadership book category on Amazon (company).

=== Thiel Fellowship and Forge ===
In 2015, Ferreira became a part of the Thiel Fellowship, a two-year program for individuals who've dropped out of college to build their careers. She co-founded Forge with Scott Ferreira, Lloyd Jones and Talulah Riley through the fellowship. Forge is an application that businesses can use to allow hourly workers select their own shifts and manage schedules. As of 2015, Ferreira served as CEO of the company.

== Awards and recognition ==
Ferreira has spoken with the United States State Department at TechCrunch Disrupt, GetInTheRing, We Are the Future’s Startup Summit, NextGen Summit, TEDxNYU, TEDxYouthSanDiego and GRAMMY Media Week. She has been a guest contributor to Virgin Entrepreneurship, Inc., Forbes, and Women 2.0. She has also received recognition for her achievements, including:

- Forbes 30 Under 30 award for her work on Forge
- On the cover of Seventeen Magazine as the Pretty Amazing Female Role Model of 2013
- Business Insider naming her one of the "Most Successful New College Dropouts"
