= William Osborne (writer) =

English barrister, screenwriter, author

- Born: 1960 (age 65–66); England
- Occupations: Barrister, screenwriter, author, company director
- Spouse: Debra Hayward (m. 2001)

William Osborne (born 1960) is an English barrister, screenwriter, author, and company director.

He lived in Hollywood from the 1980s to 2001, after which he returned to England and began writing children’s fiction.

== Early life ==
Osborne was educated at Gresham's School, Holt, then at Robert Louis Stevenson School, Pebble Beach, California, and St John's College, Cambridge, where he studied law and was Vice President of the Cambridge Footlights, and finally at the Middle Temple, from where he was called to the bar.

== Career ==
Shortly after beginning his career as a barrister, Osborne moved to Hollywood with a friend, William Davies, and began to write film scripts. Their only preparation for this new career was to buy a book called Screenplay and read it five times. Osborne became a member of the Writers Guild of America West and has written for more than sixty films, including GoldenEye (1995).

He has been a director of Loveb Films since 2012.

In 2001, Osborne married the film producer Debra Hayward, and they have four children. He returned from California to marry Hayward, and they later moved from London to Glandford, Norfolk, with Osborne taking up writing children’s fiction. His recreations include cold water swimming, Lego, and driving a beach buggy.

== Filmography as writer ==
- Student Exchange (TV movie, 1987)
- Twins (1988)
- Short Time (1990)
- Stop! Or My Mom Will Shoot (1992)
- The Real McCoy (1993)
- Ghost in the Machine (1993)
- Bermuda Grace (TV movie, 1994)
- Dr. Jekyll and Ms. Hyde (1995)
- GoldenEye (1995)
- What Rats Won't Do (1998)
- Chilly Dogs (2001)
- The Scorpion King (2002)
- Fat Slags (2004)
- Thunderbirds (2004)

== Novels ==
- Hitler’s Secret (Chicken House: 2012)
- Winter’s Bullet (Chicken House: 2014)
- Jupiter's Fire (2019)
