= Allie Teilz =

- Born: February 23, 1994 (age 32); Phoenix, Arizona, U.S.
- Occupations: DJ; musician; model; designer
- Years active: 2010–present
- Partner(s): Joaquin Phoenix (2013–2016); Alfie Allen (2017-2019); Spike Jonze (2019–2025)

Allie Teilz (born February 23, 1994) is an American DJ, music producer, model and fashion designer.

== Early life and education ==
Teilz was born and raised in Phoenix, Arizona. Her early exposure to music was influenced by her parents' varied musical preferences, including disco and new wave. At 13, she worked at a local record store, where she gained experience in music and event production. By 15, she organized concerts at venues such as the Rhythm Room and Crescent Ballroom in Phoenix. At 17, she worked in live production for arena tours, including Kanye West and Jay-Z's Watch the Throne tour at the MGM Grand, Las Vegas.

Teilz attended Arcadia High School and Xavier College Preparatory.

== Career ==
Teilz is a vinyl DJ and music producer who blends genres such as disco, funk, hip-hop, house, and soul. She has performed at music festivals, including Coachella, Lollapalooza, Glastonbury, and events such as the Grammy Awards, Golden Globe Awards, and the Academy Awards.

She has collaborated with artists such as Daft Punk, Grace Jones, Radiohead, Stevie Wonder and Quincy Jones. She was appointed music director of Clifton's Republic in 2020.

In 2023, she released her debut single, "Type of Girl," followed by "Type of Girl Pt. 2" in 2024, featuring Channel Tres. She also created VISIONS, a New York and Los Angeles-based event series featuring artists Todd Edwards, Peanut Butter Wolf, Dam Funk, Blu DeTiger and Kelly Lee Owens.

Teilz has starred in music videos for Silversun Pickups including "Dots and Dashes (Enough Already)" and "Little Lovers So Polite," Chateau Marmont's "Wind Blows," and Deerhunter Lotus Plaza's "Black Buzz." She has modeled for Swarovski, 7 for All Mankind, Beats By Dr Dre, Teen Vogue, Levis, Nasty Gal, Urban Outfitters, American Apparel, Skullcandy, Chanel, Armani as well as Larry Clark.

In 2026, she announced her debut studio album, Come to Mommy, scheduled for release on October 9, 2026.

== Fashion ==
In 2016, Teilz launched a gender-inclusive fashion line specializing in customizable suits. Her designs emphasize versatility and inclusivity and draw inspiration from figures such as Grace Jones and David Bowie. Her work has appeared in publications such as Vogue, WWD, and Vanity Fair. She has collaborated with brands including Chanel, Armani, and Gucci.

== Personal life ==
Teilz was in a relationship with actor Joaquin Phoenix, whom she dated from 2013 to 2016. Teilz has a daughter with actor Alfie Allen, with whom she was in a relationship from 2017 to 2019. From 2019 to 2025, Teilz was in a relationship with filmmaker Spike Jonze, whom she met in 2013 on the set of Her. They have three sons: twins born in 2023 and another in 2024. Teilz resides in Los Angeles with her family.
