= MySocialCloud =

- Company type: Private
- Headquarters: Los Angeles, United States
- Key people: Scott Ferreira (CEO)
- Services: Password storage and protection
- Website: http://mysocialcloud.com/

MySocialCloud is a cloud-based bookmark vault and password website that allows users to log into all of their online accounts from a single, secure website. The company's investors include Sir Richard Branson, Insight Venture Partners’ Jerry Murdock, and PhotoBucket founder Alex Welch. The company and its founders have been featured in TechCrunch and The Huffington Post.

== History ==
MySocialCloud was co-founded by Scott Ferreira, Stacey Ferreira, and Shiv Prakash in 2011. The idea for a one-stop password storage and login tool came when a computer crash left Scott without documents he used to store access information to his online data.

In 2013, the siblings sold MySocialCloud to Reputation.com.

== Services ==
MySocialCloud is cloud-based, and the platform lets users securely store passwords and automatically log into several social media websites simultaneously. The website auto-populates password fields, letting the user log into all of the sites at the push of a button.

The service also provides users with security updates for the websites they have included in their profile, and informs users if a website has been hacked. Security played a major role during development of the platform. Passwords stored on the service are salted and hashed with a two-way encryption method known as AES.
