= Xavier College Preparatory (Arizona) =

Private, all-female school in Phoenix

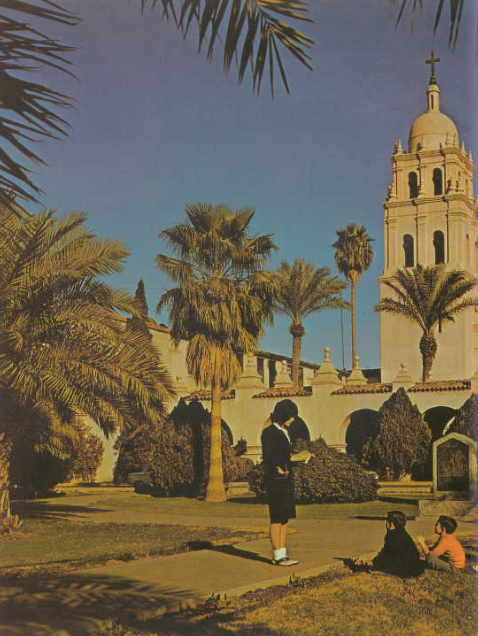
- Xavier College Preparatory in 1964

Location
- 4710 North Fifth Street; Phoenix, (Maricopa County), Arizona 85012; United States
- 33°30′20″N 112°4′2″W

Information
- Type: Private, All-Female
- Motto: Women of faith pursuing excellence; Leadership∙Tradition∙Community∙Service
- Religious affiliation: Catholic
- Established: 1943
- Founder: Sisters of Charity of the Blessed Virgin Mary
- President: Sister Joan Fitzgerald, BVM
- Principal: Carol Ann Michaelson
- Faculty: 123
- Grades: 9–12
- Campus: Urban
- Colors: Royal blue, white and kelly green
- Mascot: Gator
- Team name: Gators
- Accreditation: North Central Association of Colleges and Schools; Western Catholic Educational Association
- Newspaper: The Xpress
- Yearbook: Xavierian
- School fees: Around $1,500
- Tuition: $24,642 for non-Catholics, $17,100 for participating Catholics
- Dean of Students: Denise Macrina
- Director of Admissions: Jennifer James
- Athletic Director: Sr. Lynn Winsor, BVM, CMAA
- Website: www.xcp.org

Xavier College Preparatory is a private, Catholic, all-girls high school in Phoenix, Arizona, United States. Located in the Roman Catholic Diocese of Phoenix, it draws students from 120 local schools.

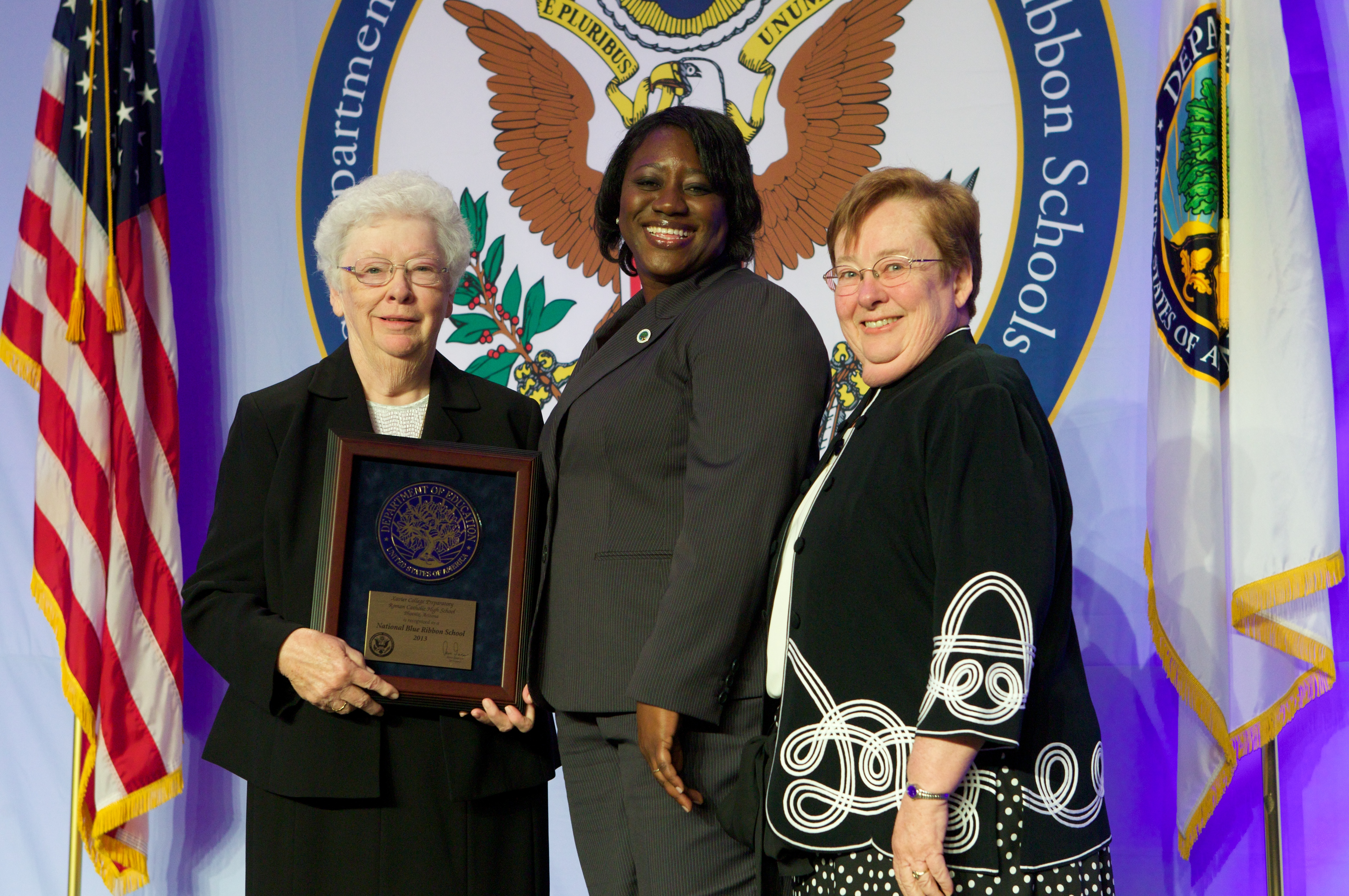
Xavier College Preparatory Roman Catholic High School, 2013 National Blue Ribbon Schools winner

== History ==
Xavier was founded in 1943 by the Jesuit Fathers of St. Francis Xavier Parish and the Sisters of Charity of the Blessed Virgin Mary. Originally located on the campus of Brophy College Preparatory, the school moved into Fitzgerald hall on its current campus in the spring of 1953. More buildings have been added as the school has grown. The school was granted College Preparatory status in 1982 and changed its name to Xavier College Preparatory.

Today, Xavier has 1,156 students, with a student-teacher ratio of 14 to 1. While the school remains all-female, students at Xavier share many classes with students from Brophy College Preparatory, the all-male Jesuit high school that is adjacent to Xavier. All leadership positions in the administration and student body are filled by women.

== Academics ==
Xavier follows a traditional college preparatory curriculum. Students are required to take classes in English, Mathematics, Catholic Theology, Social Studies, Laboratory Sciences, World Languages, Fine Arts and Physical Education as well as half a semester of Computer Programming. 46 Honors classes are available in all fields of study, and 27 Advanced Placement Classes are available to students in grades 9–12. All seniors are required to take AP Literature. There is also a service requirement for all juniors. Students were permitted to take classes at Brophy College Preparatory however, this is no longer the case. Dual Enrollment is available through Rio Salado College and most classes offer dual credit.

In the past 10 years, the school has congratulated 89 National Merit Finalists, 143 Commended Scholars, 36 National Hispanic Scholars, and five National Black American Scholars. Xavier students have been designated Presidential Scholars in 1979, 1986, 1990, 2001, 2008, and 2014; Presidential Scholar Semi-Finalists in 1975, 1993, and 2014; and Flinn Scholars in 2004, 2014, 2016, and 2019. In the 1990–91, 1994–96, and 2013–14 school years it was honored as a Blue Ribbon school.

== Athletics ==
Xavier has numerous sports teams including teams in cross country, track, crew, golf, tennis, badminton, cheer, pom, swim/dive, soccer, volleyball, sand volleyball, basketball, softball, archery, shotgun, and eSports.

Xavier Spiritline cheer won the USA national championship in 2017. Xavier Spiritline pom got second place in the USA national championship in 2017. Xavier also fields championship golf, badminton, swim/dive, cross country, volleyball, basketball, soccer, track and softball teams as well as active club teams in crew, lacrosse, and shooting sports.

Xavier Swim team has won more state championships than any other high school in Arizona with 27 state titles since 1985.

== Student life ==
Xavier High School has over 80 clubs available to students including three publications and multiple honors societies, including a Computer Science Honor Society. They also have an extensive theatre program and many opportunities to travel abroad for both study and service.

== Honor societies ==
Xavier was the first high school in the state of Arizona to found a chapter of the Computer Science Honor Society. The induction of its founding members occurred on August 28, 2019. The Computer Science Department was inspired by Sister Mary Kenneth Keller, BVM, who was one of the first two Americans to earn a PhD in Computer Science and a member of the same order of nuns, the Sisters of Charity of the Blessed Virgin Mary, which has run Xavier since its founding in 1943. The Xavier Computer Science Honor Society also offers many opportunities for young women to become more involved in STEAM. One of the Society's biggest events of the year is Girls Have IT Day. Girls Have IT is run by members of the Xavier Computer Science Honor Society, and invites middle school girls from all across the Valley to gain more knowledge about STEAM subjects through a series of booths and hands-on activities set up around the Xavier campus that are run by Xavier students. The middle school girls who attend Girls Have IT Day enjoy learning about STEAM from their "near-peer" instructors, and after coming to the event, 90% of the attendees are inspired to work harder in school.

== Notable alumnae ==
- Betsey Bayless, Secretary of State of Arizona
- Amanda Blumenherst, professional golfer
- Aidy Bryant, actress and comedian
- Allie Teilz, musician and artist
- Jeanne Collier, diver and Olympic medalist
- Heather Farr, professional golfer
- Sarah Schmeizel, professional golfer
- Stacey Ferreira, entrepreneur, speaker, and author
- Khalia Lanier, volleyball player
- Lois Maffeo, musician
- Meghan McCain, news commentator
- Grace Park, professional golfer
- Loret Miller Ruppe, U.S. ambassador and director of the Peace Corps
- Emma Stone, actress
- Cheyenne Woods, professional golfer
