= Black Bag =

2025 film by Steven Soderbergh

- Theatrical release poster
- Directed by: Steven Soderbergh
- Written by: David Koepp
- Produced by: Casey Silver; Gregory Jacobs
- Starring: Cate Blanchett; Michael Fassbender; Marisa Abela; Tom Burke; Naomie Harris; Regé-Jean Page; Pierce Brosnan
- Cinematography: Peter Andrews
- Edited by: Mary Ann Bernard
- Music by: David Holmes
- Production company: Casey Silver Productions
- Distributed by: Focus Features (United States); Universal Pictures (International)
- Release dates: March 12, 2025 (France); March 14, 2025 (United States)
- Running time: 94 minutes
- Country: United States
- Language: English
- Budget: $50–60 million
- Box office: $43.8 million

Black Bag is a 2025 American spy thriller film directed by Steven Soderbergh and written by David Koepp. It stars Cate Blanchett, Michael Fassbender, Marisa Abela, Tom Burke, Naomie Harris, Regé-Jean Page, and Pierce Brosnan. In the film, British intelligence officer George Woodhouse (Fassbender) is assigned to investigate a list of suspected traitors, one of whom is his wife, Kathryn (Blanchett).

The film was announced in January 2024, after the involvements of Soderbergh, Blanchett, and Fassbender were confirmed. The rest of the cast was rounded out that March and principal photography commenced that May, with filming taking place across London and at Pinewood Studios.

Black Bag was theatrically released first in France on March 12, 2025, by Universal Pictures, and in the United States two days later, by Focus Features. It received critical acclaim and grossed $43.4 million worldwide on a $50–60 million budget.

== Plot ==
George Woodhouse, a counterintelligence officer with the National Cyber Security Centre (NCSC), is given one week by his superior, Philip Meacham, to investigate the leak of a top-secret software program code-named Severus. One of five suspects is George's wife, Kathryn, who is also an intelligence officer. He invites the other four suspects, also NCSC operatives, over for dinner. The four suspects are satellite imagery specialist Clarissa, her boyfriend and case officer Freddie, counterintelligence officer James, and his girlfriend Zoe, who is also the staff psychiatrist. At dinner, George drugs their food to lower their inhibitions. In an effort to learn more about his guests, George engages them in a psychological game. Among other things, it is revealed that Freddie has been cheating on Clarissa, to which Clarissa responds by stabbing Freddie in the hand with a steak knife.

That same evening, Meacham dies of a heart attack while drinking in his home. George begins to focus on Kathryn after finding a ticket to a movie theatre in her dresser waste basket, and she denies having seen the film. He tricks her into giving him access to her office, logs into her computer and learns that she will be traveling to Zurich. Later, James informs George that Kathryn has access to a Zurich bank account containing £7 million (2024) (US$8.95 million) in misdirected and unexplained funds. In a psychiatric session, Zoe asks if Kathryn prioritizes her career or her husband. In a subsequent session, Zoe breaks up with James. George uses Clarissa's infidelity to pressure her to redirect a spy satellite and watches Kathryn meet with a Russian dissident, Lieutenant Colonel Andrei Kulikov, in Switzerland.

It is revealed that during the few minutes George had the satellite redirected, another dissident Russian named General Vadim Pavlichuk disappeared from a Liechtenstein safehouse with a copy of the Severus program, and he and Kulikov are now en route to Eastern Europe to use it to cause a nuclear meltdown in Russia. Clarissa tells Freddie, with whom she has reconciled, about her involvement, and Freddie secretly warns Kathryn that George suspects her. In bed that night, the couple compare notes and realize they are being set up. Kathryn uses Clarissa to track Pavlichuk. She suspects that their boss, Stieglitz, deliberately leaked Severus to cause a meltdown and destabilize the Russian government even though it would kill thousands of innocent people. She leaks the expat Russians' location to a CIA contact, resulting in a drone strike that kills them as they travel through Poland. George subjects all suspects except Kathryn to a polygraph test to determine who is behind the leak.

They invite the other four suspects to a second dinner party. Instead of serving dinner, Kathryn places a gun on the table while George announces they will play a game in which he asks each of them a single question. His questions reveal several secrets, including that Freddie and Zoe had an affair, and that Zoe learned of the Severus program from James and attempted to stop its dissemination due to her Catholic faith. George states that there were two plots: one by Stieglitz and James to leak Severus and cause a nuclear meltdown to destabilize the Russian government, and another by Zoe and Freddie to use Kathryn to stop it. James grabs the gun, confesses to plotting with Stieglitz and killing Meacham, and fires at George twice. However, the gun is loaded with blanks. Kathryn pulls a gun from her bag and kills James, after which she firmly warns the remaining colleagues to never exploit her and George's mutual fidelity again. George dumps James's body in a lake. Kathryn informs Stieglitz that his plot failed and suggests he remove himself from his position. She and George reaffirm their love for each other. At Kathryn's questioning, George reveals that the Zurich bank account containing £7 million is still untouched.

== Cast ==
- Cate Blanchett as Kathryn St. Jean, the NCSC Head of Signals Operations and George's wife
- Michael Fassbender as George T. Woodhouse, an NCSC counterintelligence officer, interrogator and Kathryn's husband
- Marisa Abela as Clarissa Beatrice Dubose, an NCSC signals intelligence and satellite imagery specialist
- Tom Burke as Frederick Alan 'Freddie' Smalls, an NCSC case officer
- Naomie Harris as Dr. Zoe Vaughan, the staff psychiatrist at NCSC headquarters
- Regé-Jean Page as James Stokes, an NCSC counterintelligence officer and military Colonel
- Pierce Brosnan as Arthur Stieglitz, the head of the NCSC
- Gustaf Skarsgård as Philip Meacham, an NCSC official and George's superior
- Kae Alexander as Anna Ko, Philip Meacham's partner
- Ambika Mod as Angela Childs, a junior NCSC intelligence officer

== Production ==
In January 2024, it was announced that Steven Soderbergh would direct the film, with Cate Blanchett and Michael Fassbender attached to star. In March, additional cast members were confirmed, including Regé-Jean Page, Marisa Abela, Naomie Harris, Pierce Brosnan, and Tom Burke.

Principal photography commenced in London on May 6, 2024. Filming also took place at Pinewood Studios. Costume design for the film was led by Ellen Mirojnick, in collaboration with Simon Holloway and the British luxury goods brand Dunhill.

David Holmes composed the score and plays a cameo role as a DJ in the opening club scene. The piece "Polyrhythmic" by Phil Kieran is included in the opening scene of the film.

== Release ==
In January 2024, Focus Features acquired the distribution rights to the film through a $60 million negative pickup deal. In July 2024, the studio scheduled the film for release on March 14, 2025.

== Reception ==
=== Box office ===
Black Bag grossed $21.5 million in the United States and Canada, and $21.1 million in other territories, for a worldwide total of $42.7 million.

In the United States and Canada, Black Bag was released alongside Novocaine, Opus, The Last Supper, and The Day the Earth Blew Up: A Looney Tunes Movie, and was projected to gross $7–8 million from 2,705 theaters during its opening weekend. The film earned $2.7 million on its first day, including an estimated $850,000 from Thursday night previews. It went on to debut with $7.6 million, placing second at the box office behind Novocaine. In its second weekend, the film grossed $4.3 million (a 44% decline), again finishing second, this time behind the debuting Snow White. It dropped out of the box office top ten in its fourth weekend.

=== Critical response ===
On the review aggregator website Rotten Tomatoes, 96% of 292 critics' reviews are positive, with an average rating of 8.1/10. The website's consensus reads: "Sleek in design and spiked with dry wit, Black Bag is an exemplary espionage caper that lets movie stars like Cate Blanchett and Michael Fassbender do what they do best—light up the screen." Metacritic, which uses a weighted average, assigned the film a score of 85 out of 100, based on 53 critics, indicating "universal acclaim". Audiences polled by CinemaScore gave the film an average grade of "B" on an A+ to F scale, while those surveyed by PostTrak gave it a 75% overall positive score, with 51% saying they would "definitely recommend" it.

Monica Castillo of RogerEbert.com awarded the film a perfect 4 out of 4 stars, describing it as "a smart, sexy spy vs. spy thriller fought mostly over dialogue," and praising Soderbergh's direction for its "svelte piece of entertainment" that feels both vintage and timely. James Berardinelli of ReelViews highlighted the film's cerebral approach, noting that it "relies on uncovering motivations and unraveling narrative knots to generate suspense" and commended the chemistry between Blanchett and Fassbender as "palpable". Empire described Black Bag as "deliciously, lip-smackingly satisfying," likening it more to John le Carré than James Bond, and praised its "punchy and sharp" script by David Koepp, as well as Soderbergh's confident direction. Justin Chang of NPR characterized the film as "a witty, sexy riff on themes of loyalty and betrayal," emphasizing its focus on character dynamics over action, and lauding the ensemble cast's performances. Sean Tajipour of Nerdtropolis called it "a masterclass in suspense". Pete Hammond of Deadline Hollywood called it "an A+ cast" for their performances.

The Hollywood Reporter praised the film's "tautly wound intrigue" and its exploration of personal betrayal and deception, calling it a "handsomely crafted thriller that luxuriates in tension and ambiguity". In his review for Rolling Stone, David Fear lauded Black Bag as "a great spy thriller — and an even better marriage drama". He emphasized the film's exploration of personal relationships within the espionage narrative, highlighting the performances of Blanchett and Fassbender. The New York Times described Black Bag as "a stylish puzzle-box of a movie" with "layered performances and serpentine plotting" while IndieWire praised its "glacial cool and moral ambiguity," suggesting it "feels like vintage Soderbergh—unapologetically clever and emotionally remote".

Other critics offered more tempered views. Peter Bradshaw of The Guardian noted that while the film is "downbeat" and "tongue-in-cheek," it borders on self-satire, and questioned the depth of its characterizations. Another review from The Guardian criticized the film's "convoluted plot and baffling character motivations," suggesting that despite its stylish presentation, it lacks the authenticity of grittier spy dramas. Mark Hanson of Slant Magazine compared the film unfavorably to Soderbergh's earlier work, stating that Black Bag "settles into a third act of derivative reveals and exposition dumps, and ultimately feels insubstantial despite its narrative complexities".

=== Director's response ===
Soderbergh expressed frustration with the film's underperformance at the box office against a budget of at least $50 million, stating, "This is the kind of film I made my career on. And if a mid-level budget, star-driven movie can't seem to get people over the age of 25 years old to come out to theatres – if that's truly a dead zone – then that's not a good thing for movies. What's gonna happen to the person behind me who wants to make this kind of film?" Focus Features assured Soderbergh that the film would eventually turn a profit with its home video release.

=== Accolades ===
Award	Date of ceremony	Category	Recipient(s)	Result	Ref.
Astra Midseason Movie Awards	July 3, 2025	Best Picture	Black Bag	Nominated	
Astra Midseason Movie Awards	July 3, 2025	Best Director	Steven Soderbergh	Nominated	
Astra Midseason Movie Awards	July 3, 2025	Best Supporting Actress	Marisa Abela	Nominated	
Dorian Awards	March 3, 2026	Unsung Film of the Year	Black Bag	Nominated	
Georgia Film Critics Association	December 27, 2025	Best Picture	Black Bag	Nominated	
Georgia Film Critics Association	December 27, 2025	Best Ensemble	Black Bag	Nominated	
Golden Trailer Awards	May 29, 2025	Best Thriller	Focus Features / Wild Card Creative Group (for "Loyalty")	Won	
Golden Trailer Awards	May 29, 2025	Best Thriller Poster	Focus Features / AV Print (for "Payoff Poster")	Nominated	
San Diego Film Critics Society	December 15, 2025	Best Ensemble	Black Bag	Won	
San Diego Film Critics Society	December 15, 2025	Best Original Screenplay	David Koepp	Runner-up	
St. Louis Film Critics Association	December 14, 2025	Best Ensemble	Black Bag	Nominated	
Writers Guild of America Awards	March 8, 2026	Best Original Screenplay	David Koepp	Nominated	
