= Debra Hayward =

British film producer (born 1964)

- Born: April 15, 1964 (age 62); Liverpool, England
- Occupation: Film producer
- Spouse: William Osborne (m. 2001)

Debra Hayward (born 15 April 1964) is a British film producer. As Head of Film at Working Title Films, Hayward frequently served as an executive producer for the company's feature films, working alongside fellow Working Title executive Liza Chasin. After producing Les Misérables, she started her own production company, Monumental Pictures.

== Life and career ==
Born in Liverpool in 1964, the daughter of John I. Hayward and his wife Annetta Lansky, Hayward joined Working Title Films in 1989, working as a producer’s assistant on films that include Fools of Fortune and Dakota Road. She later became a development executive for the company, and produced several films such as London Kills Me and Map of the Human Heart. Hayward served as Head of Film for Working Title and was creatively responsible for the company’s entire slate of feature films in conjunction with her American counterpart, Liza Chasin. Both Hayward and Chasin have served as executive producers on films that include Bridget Jones's Diary, Atonement and The Boat That Rocked. More recently Hayward has worked on critically acclaimed hits Tinker Tailor Soldier Spy and Senna. September 2011 saw the launch of her new production company Monumental Pictures.

Hayward's first solo film as producer was Les Misérables, which went on to win multiple awards, raising her profile.

In 2014 she started her own production house, Monumental Pictures, with fellow producer Alison Owen.

On 14 October 2018, it was announced that late singer Amy Winehouse's family had respectively signed a multi-million pound deal with Hayward’s film company, Monumental Pictures to make a biopic about her life, which will be directed by Alison Owen and produced by Hayward.

She is married to the English screenwriter Will Osborne and has four children. He returned from California to marry Hayward, and they moved from London to Glandford, Norfolk.

== Filmography ==
Year	Film	Role
1990	Fools of Fortune	Assistant to Sarah Radclyffe
1994	Four Weddings and a Funeral	Head of development: Working Title
1995	French Kiss	Head of development: Working Title
1996	Loch Ness	Associate producer
1997	The Matchmaker	Co-producer
1997	The Borrowers	Co-producer
1998	What Rats Won't Do	Head of development: Working Title
1998	Elizabeth	Co-producer
2001	Bridget Jones's Diary	Co-producer
2001	Captain Corelli's Mandolin	Co-producer
2002	40 Days and 40 Nights	Co-producer
2002	About a Boy	Co-producer
2002	The Guru	Executive producer
2003	Ned Kelly	Co-producer
2003	Johnny English	Co-producer
2003	Love Actually	Co-producer
2004	Thunderbirds	Executive producer
2004	Wimbledon	Executive producer
2004	Bridget Jones: The Edge of Reason	Executive producer
2005	The Interpreter	Co-producer
2005	Pride & Prejudice	Executive producer
2005	Nanny McPhee	Executive producer
2006	United 93	Executive producer
2006	Catch a Fire	Executive producer
2007	Elizabeth: The Golden Age	Executive producer
2007	Mr. Bean's Holiday	Co-producer
2007	Atonement	Executive producer
2008	Frost/Nixon	Executive producer
2009	State of Play	Executive producer
2009	The Boat That Rocked	Executive producer
2010	Green Zone	Executive producer
2010	Nanny McPhee and the Big Bang	Executive producer
2010	Senna	Executive producer
2011	Paul	Executive producer
2011	Tinker Tailor Soldier Spy	Executive producer
2011	Johnny English Reborn	Executive producer
2012	Les Misérables	Producer
2013	I Give It a Year	Executive producer
2016	Bridget Jones's Baby	Producer
2019	How to Build a Girl	Producer
2019	Cats	Producer
2024	Back to Black	Producer
2025	The Woman in Cabin 10	Producer
TBA	A Matter of Time	Producer
