= Back to Black (film) =

2024 film by Sam Taylor-Johnson

- UK theatrical release poster
- Directed by: Sam Taylor-Johnson
- Screenplay by: Matt Greenhalgh
- Produced by: Alison Owen; Debra Hayward; Nicky Kentish-Barnes
- Starring: Marisa Abela; Jack O'Connell; Eddie Marsan; Lesley Manville
- Cinematography: Polly Morgan
- Edited by: Martin Walsh; Laurence Johnson
- Music by: Nick Cave; Warren Ellis
- Production companies: Monumental Pictures; StudioCanal
- Distributed by: StudioCanal (United Kingdom); Focus Features (United States)
- Release dates: 12 April 2024 (United Kingdom); 17 May 2024 (United States)
- Running time: 122 minutes
- Countries: United Kingdom; United States
- Language: English
- Budget: $30 million
- Box office: $51 million

Back to Black is a 2024 biographical drama film based on the life of English singer-songwriter Amy Winehouse, played by Marisa Abela. Directed by Sam Taylor-Johnson and written by Matt Greenhalgh, the film also stars Jack O'Connell, Eddie Marsan and Lesley Manville.

Following the death of Winehouse in July 2011, several filmmakers attempted to create biopic projects, but none of them progressed. In 2018, Winehouse's estate announced they had signed a deal for a film about her life and career. By July 2022, StudioCanal moved forward with production, and filming took place in London from January to April 2023.

The film was released theatrically by StudioCanal in Australia on 11 April 2024, and was released in the United Kingdom on 12 April 2024. Focus Features released the film in the United States on 17 May 2024. It has received mixed reviews from critics and grossed $51 million worldwide.

== Plot ==
Amy Winehouse is raised in a Jewish family, with her father Mitch and her grandmother Cynthia both sharing their love for music and singing. Amy's friend Tyler hands his manager Nick a demo tape of Amy's recording and he is impressed by her talent. She then signs a contract with Island Records and releases her debut album, Frank (2003).

After enjoying critical and commercial success, her record label suggests making some changes to her stage act before releasing Frank in the United States, which Amy strongly disagrees with. She announces she needs time off to "live her songs", and then meets Blake Fielder-Civil in a pub in Camden Town, where they fall in love. Their relationship is soon troubled by Blake's cocaine addiction, as well as Amy's alcoholism and bulimia. After experiencing Amy's irritable behaviour, Blake reveals he thinks they would be better as friends, as he plans to reconcile with his ex-girlfriend Becky, leaving Amy heartbroken. Before travelling to New York City, she learns her grandmother has terminal lung cancer. After a difficult period of these traumatising events all happening at once, she gathers inspiration to write her second album, Back to Black (2006), which becomes a global success.

Blake and Amy reconcile shortly after the release of Back to Black. They elope to Miami, much to Mitch's dismay. Soon afterwards, Blake is arrested for assaulting a pub landlord and serves a two-year sentence in jail for perverting the course of justice. Before he is released and as Amy has now become a drug addict, Blake tells her he has been undergoing counselling and asks her for a divorce, as he wants a fresh start.

After various blackouts, Amy agrees to check into a rehabilitation centre, and later wins five Grammy Awards. Three years later at her new home on Camden Square, Amy is now clean of drugs and trying to tackle her alcohol dependence. After a visit from Mitch, the paparazzi appear outside her gate and reveal that Blake has a new girlfriend called Sarah who has just had his baby. A tearful Amy sings "Tears Dry on Their Own" and walks up to her bedroom.

A postscript reveals that Amy was found dead at the age of 27 on 23 July 2011 and her death was caused by alcohol poisoning after a long period of sobriety. She was laid to rest with her grandmother, Cynthia.

== Cast ==
- Marisa Abela as Amy Winehouse
- Jack O'Connell as Blake Fielder-Civil
- Eddie Marsan as Mitch Winehouse
- Lesley Manville as Cynthia Levy
- Juliet Cowan as Janis Winehouse
- Sam Buchanan as Nick Shymansky
- Pete Lee-Wilson as Perfume Pete
- Thelma Ruby as Great Auntie Renee
- Matilda Thorpe as Auntie Melody
- Ryan O'Doherty as Chris Taylor
- Spike Fearn as Tyler James
- Harley Bird as Juliette Ashby
- Francesca Henry as Chantelle Dusette
- Liv Longbourne as Catriona Gourlay
- Bronson Webb as Joey the dealer
- Ansu Kabia as Raye Cosbert
- Miltos Yerolemou as Jimmy

== Production ==
=== Development ===
After the death of Winehouse in 2011, filmmakers attempted to create a feature biopic with various projects, including one in 2015 with Noomi Rapace attached to star, but none moved forward. In October 2018, it was announced that Winehouse's estate had signed a deal to make a biopic about her life and career. In July 2022, Deadline Hollywood reported that StudioCanal was moving forward with a feature film entitled Back to Black. Sam Taylor-Johnson directed from a script by Matt Greenhalgh. Alison Owen and Debra Hayward produced under their Monumental Pictures banner, alongside Nicky Kentish-Barnes.

=== Casting ===
In January 2023, it was reported that Marisa Abela would star as Winehouse, and Jack O'Connell, Eddie Marsan and Lesley Manville were also cast. O'Connell portrays Blake Fielder-Civil, Amy's husband from 2007 to 2009. Marsan and Manville play Amy's father and grandmother, Mitch Winehouse and Cynthia Winehouse, respectively. Juliet Cowan portrays Amy's mother, Janis Winehouse. Nina Gold served as casting director.

=== Filming ===
Principal photography took place in London from January to April 2023, with Polly Morgan serving as cinematographer. Scenes were filmed at Ronnie Scott's Jazz Club, outside Winehouse's first flat in Camden Town, and at Primrose Hill. In February, scenes were shot inside the Metropolis Studios in Chiswick. From 13 March to 18 March, production moved to Fitzrovia to film scenes at the Fitzroy Square. The following week, Abela and O'Connell shot scenes at London Zoo.

=== Music ===
Back to Black features many of Winehouse's songs from Universal Music Group and Sony Music Publishing, with Abela's vocals throughout the film. Nick Cave and Warren Ellis scored the film, while Giles Martin served as the music producer.

In March 2024, a compilation soundtrack of Winehouse's original recordings was announced along with tracks from her inspirations such as Dinah Washington, Minnie Riperton and the Shangri-Las as their voices are featured in the film. A new tribute song from Nick Cave to Winehouse, "Song for Amy" was also included in the credits as well as on the soundtrack.

== Release ==
Originally scheduled to be released by StudioCanal in Australia on 18 April 2024, the film's release there was moved forward by a week to 11 April. The film was respectively released by StudioCanal UK and Kino Swiat in the United Kingdom and Poland on 12 April 2024, followed by Germany and the Netherlands on 18 April, and France and New Zealand the following week.

Focus Features purchased the North American and select international distribution rights for $20 million, which according to Deadline Hollywood limited the film marketing. Its parent company Universal Pictures handled some international distribution, excluding territories where StudioCanal or its affiliates have rights to the film. Focus Features originally scheduled the film to be released in the US on 10 May 2024, but that release date was subsequently moved a week later.

== Reception ==
=== Box office ===
As of 17 July 2024, Back to Black has grossed $6.1 million in the United States and Canada and $44.8 million in other territories, for a worldwide total of $51 million.

Back to Black debuted at number one in the UK and Ireland with £2.77 million ($3.4 million), ahead of Civil War.

In the United States and Canada, Back to Black was released alongside IF and The Strangers: Chapter 1, and was projected to gross $4–6 million from 2,008 theaters in its opening weekend. The film made $1.2 million on its first day ($375,000 from Thursday night previews), and went on to debut to $2.9 million, finishing in fifth.

=== Critical response ===
On the review aggregator website Rotten Tomatoes, 35% of 183 critics' reviews are positive, with an average rating of 4.9/10. The website's consensus reads: "Back to Black's sympathetic approach to its subject's story is an overdue antidote to the tabloid treatment she often received in life, even if the end results are disappointingly pedestrian." Metacritic, which uses a weighted average, assigned the film a score of 43 out of 100, based on 45 critics, indicating "mixed or average" reviews. Audiences polled by CinemaScore gave the film an average grade of "B+" on an A+ to F scale.

Variety's Owen Gleiberman found that "Sam Taylor-Johnson's jazz-meets-rock-star drama exerts an authentic fascination, even as its dysfunctional-addict love story keeps us at a distance". Nick Levine of NME also rated Back to Black four out of five, stating "This film was always going to face accusations of being exploitative – given the way Winehouse was scrutinised when she was alive – but the naysayers needn't have worried. Taylor-Johnson's film (particularly the ending) is impressively deft and delicate". Kyle Smith of The Wall Street Journal wrote, "The film is detailed, vivid, enthralling -- and necessarily full of pain. The performances are top-notch, led by Ms. Abela, who does her own singing in an amazing re-creation of Winehouse's muscular soul vocals."

Hamish Macbain of the Evening Standard was critical of the film, writing, "The final scene, in particular, with its completely and utterly baseless, sensationalist implications, made me physically gasp in horror". Charlotte O'Sullivan of The Independent gave the film a score of two out of five, stating that "Despite strong performances from Marisa Abela and Jack O'Connell as the late icon and her one-time husband Blake Fielder-Civil, Sam Taylor-Johnson's controversial film tiptoes around judging anyone who isn't part of the paparazzi – Blake and Amy's father Mitch get off scot-free". Writing for IndieWire, Vikram Murthi concluded, "The palpable sincerity behind Back to Black almost makes its myriad weaknesses more glaring. Everyone involved in the film approaches the late artist with love and respect, but its tawdry instincts and misguided sense of responsibility let her memory down. Its refusal to delve into the ugly realities of addiction or pop stardom generates a vague portrait of a lost girl in need of saving".

=== Accolades ===
Award	Date of ceremony	Category	Recipient(s)	Result	Ref.
Golden Trailer Awards	30 May 2024	Best Drama	"Voice"	Nominated	
Hollywood Music in Media Awards	20 November 2024	Music Themed Film, Biopic or Musical	Back to Black	Nominated	
British Independent Film Awards	8 December 2024	Best Supporting Performance	Jack O'Connell	Nominated	
British Independent Film Awards	8 December 2024	Best Make-Up & Hair Design	Peta Dunstall	Nominated	
British Independent Film Awards	8 December 2024	Best Music Supervision	Iain Cooke and Giles Martin	Nominated	
