= Arabs in Malta =

Arabs in Malta Għarab f'Malta العرب في مالطا
Total population
- 5,000+

Languages
- Arabic and Maltese

Religion
- Predominantly Islam

Related ethnic groups
- Arab people, Arab diaspora, Arab Americans, Arab Argentine, Arab Brazilian, Arab Canadians, Arab Mexican, Maltese people, other Semitic-speaking peoples

The Arabs in Malta (Maltese: Għarab f'Malta; Arabic: العرب في مالطا) are, today, mostly expatriates from a range of Arab countries, particularly Libya and Syria. However, the history of Arabs in Malta goes back to 869 AD when Ahmad ibn Umar, the emir of Crete, ruled Malta for a short period of time before he was expelled. A year later, a larger Arab army under Muhammed ibn Hafagab, the Arab governor of Sicily, ruled the islands. The Arabs ruled Malta until the 11th century when they were defeated by the Normans.

== History ==
=== Arab conquest of Malta ===
Malta remained under the control of the Byzantine Empire until 870, when it was conquered by the Arabs during the Arab–Byzantine wars. The Greek population was exterminated or sold into slavery. Malta was under control of the Aghlabid dynasty in both Tunisia and the emirate of Sicily. After the defeat of the Byzantines, however, Malta was left as an unsettled ruin by the Arabs for approximately 180 years, according to the records of the Arab chronicler Al-Himyarī, although this account has been disputed by recent historians. At least two other chronicles, by Muhammad al-Idrisi and Al Hawqal, describe life in Malta, but with little discussion of objects of daily life such as food or domestic buildings; Al-Himyarī states that Malta remained a ruin (hirba) and was only visited by "foreign shipbuilders, fishermen, and honey collectors". Despite this, Al-Himyarī's account indicates that the Arabs had rebuilt enough of Malta's infrastructure to both have a presence and to defend themselves from attack; the Arabs repelled a Byzantine attempt to reclaim Malta in 1053 by making promises to their slave armies, who vastly outnumbered them, in exchange for fighting the Byzantines.

However, other than place names, headstones, and the linguistic influence of Arabic on Maltese, the evidence left for over two centuries of Arab rule is sparse. Two significant developments that occurred under Arab rule were the introductions of citrus fruits and cotton. Arabs did not impose Islam on the local population, but did require an additional tribute to be paid among those who did not convert. Despite insistence from early historians about the unbroken Christian continuity of Malta, scholars are now largely in agreement that Christianity effectively vanished from Malta while under Arab rule, suggesting that the local population was deported and replaced with Arabic speakers.

=== Norman conquest ===
Arab control of Malta eventually ended in 1091 after the conquest of the Normans by Roger Guiscard, later known as Roger I of Sicily. Although Roger first attacked Sicily in 1061, which sparked three decades of bloody warfare, he was able to seize Malta in a ruse without bloodshed. While Arabs were permitted to leave with the property they could take with them, Roger and his son, Roger II of Sicily, permitted Arab Muslims and Jews to worship freely. Moreover, Guiscard allowed Muslim subjects to remain under the rule of the now defeated emir, provided they paid an additional tax to the new Sicilian ruler. Even under the rule of Roger II, Muslim baptisms continued in Malta

There is evidence that Arabs stayed in Malta until 1122; that year, some Arabs refused to pay their annual tribute and plotted to massacre the local Maltese a first step in regaining control over the islands. The plot was ultimately discovered, with the details being relayed back to the Sicily. Many of its leaders were caught and executed and a great number of Arabs left Malta again.

=== Arabic in Malta ===
The greatest and most enduring influence of Arabs in Malta was the development of the Maltese language, derived from late medieval Sicilian Arabic. The Maltese language is a Latinised variety of spoken historical Arabic through its descent from Siculo-Arabic, which developed as a Maghrebi Arabic dialect in the Emirate of Sicily between 831 and 1091.

Contact between the Maltese language and Arabic continued for centuries after the Norman conquest brought an end to Arab rule. In the 1600s, Maghrebi Arabic was still widely spoke in Malta alongside Maltese, as many of the hundreds of enslaved people, both on the islands and in the waters around Malta, had been enslaved from Northern Africa. Given the prolonged contact, Maltese has developed many morphological, syntactic, and lexical similarities to Maghrebi Arabic. Maltese is today the only Semitic language written in the Latin alphabet.

== Present day ==
Much like the situation in other European countries, the Arab community in Malta faces discrimination and anti-Arab racism.

== Notable people ==
- Rachid Chouhal (born 1975), athlete – born in Morocco
- Carlo Gimach (1651–1730), architect, engineer and poet – descendant of a Palestinian Catholic refugee

== See also ==
- Arab diaspora
- Arabs in Europe
- Demographics of Malta
- Immigration to Malta
- Islam in Malta
- Aghlabids
