= How to Be a Woman =

2011 non-fiction memoir by British writer Caitlin Moran

How to be a Woman
- Author: Caitlin Moran
- Language: English
- Genre: Memoir
- Published: 16 June 2011
- Publisher: Ebury Press
- Publication place: United Kingdom
- Awards: Galaxy National Book Awards, Irish Book Award
- ISBN: 978-0091940744

How to Be a Woman is a 2011 non-fiction memoir by British writer Caitlin Moran. The book documents Moran's early life (from teens until mid-thirties) including her views on feminism. As of July 2014, it had sold over a million copies.

== Overview ==
Caitlin Moran wrote How To Be a Woman with the goal of making feminism more approachable for every woman by telling stories of her own life's struggles. She wants women to stop seeing feminists as radical man-haters and to start seeing them as advocates for true equality. In her book Moran calls out any woman who doesn't identify as a feminist saying that all women are inherently feminists unless they reject any notion of personal freedom. Being labeled as a feminist could be positive or negative. Moran tells her own feminist stories using "forceful and self-deprecating humor" that any woman can relate to. In an interview done by NPR, Moran says that she uses humour in her writing because "it's kind of hard to argue with someone who's making you laugh".

== Content ==
Moran discusses topics such as the concept of naming body parts, her own experience of childbirth, and the stigma surrounding abortion.

== Fifth-wave feminism ==
In How to Be a Woman, Moran calls for a fifth wave of feminism to rise up. Moran states, "But if there is to be a fifth wave of feminism, I would hope that the main thing that distinguishes it from all that came before is that women counter the awkwardness, disconnect, and bullshit of being a modern woman not by shouting at it, internalizing it, or squabbling about it—but by simply pointing at it and going 'HA!' instead."

== Critical response ==
Emma Brockes of the New York Times described the work as "a book that needed to be written". Miranda Sawyer of The Guardian called the book "a joy" and "a triumph". Peggy Orenstein of Slate gave the book a favorable review, writing "she is, in equal measure, intellectual, rebel and goofball." The Independent wrote, "it would be almost unkind to call this an important book, because what it is mostly is engaging, brave and consistently, cleverly, naughtily funny, but actually it is important that we talk about this stuff." NPR spoke positively of How to Be a Woman, describing Moran as in the vein of the late Nora Ephron.

The Telegraph, while praising the book, noted "The book has not, however, met with universal approval. Germaine Greer, whom Moran idolises as "Goddess Greer" but nonetheless disagrees with on a number of issues, has accused Moran of setting up a 'straw woman' version of herself to argue with, and of skimping on her homework." Time called How to Be a Woman "hugely lovable" but "problematically narrow."

== Awards ==
- 2011 Galaxy National Book Awards, Book of the Year
- 2011 Galaxy National Book Awards, Popular Non-Fiction Book of the Year
- 2011 Irish Book Award, Listeners Choice category, How to Be A Woman

=== Nominations ===
- Goodreads Choice Awards Best Humor

== Bibliography ==
- Moran, Caitlin (2012). How to Be a Woman (paperback ed.). London: Ebury Press. ISBN 978-0-091-94074-4.
