= Tour accountant =

Accountant responsible for financial operations of a concert tour

A tour accountant is responsible for the financial operations of a large-scale concert tour. Normally, a tour accountant will report to both the tour manager (for all matters regarding tour financial operations), and to the artist manager/business manager (for overall financial reporting).

Appointing a specialist tour accountant is valuable when preparing a tour budget. The tour accountant handles everything from tracking venue deposits and merchandising sales for tours, to ensuring that booking agents and promoters are charging fees and deducting expenses fairly, and that proper payment is received based on online ticket sales and box office receipts. In addition, the tour accountant is responsible for paying wages and per diems and reimbursing expenses incurred by band members and staff while on the road. While on the road, they manage petty cash and settle hotel bills.

== Responsibilities ==
From a tour perspective, the tour accountant will normally: handle periodic financial transactions (either with artist management, or promoter), including per diem draw, wire transfers of both direct (promoter > artist management) and indirect (promoter > tour accountant > artist management; usually box office receipts collected at settlement by tour accountant) funds, per diem distribution, hotel settlement, currency exchange (international tours), negotiate all local tax issues (concerning artist earnings in each individual local market), and constantly work to clear up any "grey areas" during the advance, that have the potential to affect show settlement. Although normally, tour members will be paid by either artist management/business management, or accounting firm, the tour accountant will act as the "conduit" between the parties, while the tour is operating.

If a tour is not large enough to warrant using a tour accountant, the tour manager will normally assume these responsibilities, as listed above. Generally, the only exception to this is if artist management travels with tour, and opts to handle the aforementioned.

== Career path ==
The path to becoming a tour accountant usually involves either advancement through the ranks (a great deal of experience with a specific artist, or artist management company), or via a more traditional route (secondary, post secondary education and degree, followed by employment with either artist management company, or specialized entertainment accounting company).
