= Alison Owen =

English film producer (born 1961)

- Born: Alison Mary Owen; 18 February 1961 (age 65); Portsmouth, England
- Occupation: Producer
- Years active: 1988–present
- Spouse(s): Andy Lavender deceased Keith Allen (m. 1984; div. 1989) Aaron Batterham (m.)
- Children: 3, including Lily and Alfie Allen

Alison Mary Owen (born 18 February 1961) is an English film producer. Her credits as a producer include Moonlight and Valentino (1995), Elizabeth (1998), Sylvia (2003), Shaun of the Dead (2004), Proof (2005), The Other Boleyn Girl (2007), Brick Lane (2007), Saving Mr. Banks (2013), Tulip Fever (2017) and Back to Black (2024).

== Life ==
Owen was born in Portsmouth, Hampshire, into a Roman Catholic family. Her parents were Mary Kathleen (née Hitchiner), a Royal Navy dockyard worker, and Peter Ronald Owen, chief petty officer in the Royal Navy, and was the younger of two daughters. Her sister is Jill Beatrice Owen.

Owen's first marriage (other sources simply say "relationship") started when she was a teenager in the 1970s, producing her first child, Sarah, in late December 1979, when Owen was an 18-year-old university student. She married actor Keith Allen in 1984, and they had two children together, pop singer Lily Allen and actor Alfie Allen, before divorcing in 1989. She also had a relationship with comedian Harry Enfield who was a common-law stepfather to Owen's children. She is married to art director Aaron Batterham.

In 2017, the National Portrait Gallery acquired an early portrait of Owen by photographer David Gwinnutt for its permanent collection.

== Career ==
She first started working at Limelight Records producing music videos. Later she produced her first film Hear My Song and a TV series called Diary of a Teenage Health Freak. She subsequently worked for Working Title Films, where she set up the low-budget film division. Her production company is Ruby Films.

== Filmography ==
Year	Film	Detail
1991	Hear My Song	
1993	The Young Americans	
1995	Moonlight and Valentino	
1998	Elizabeth	
2001	Happy Now?	
2003	Sylvia	
2004	Shaun of the Dead	
2005	Proof	
2007	Brick Lane	
2008	The Other Boleyn Girl	
2011	Jane Eyre	
2013	Saving Mr. Banks	
2014	The Giver	Executive producer
2015	Suffragette	
2017	Tulip Fever	
2019	How to Build a Girl	
2024	Back to Black	

== Awards and nominations ==
Year	Nominee / work	Award	Result
1995	Smashie and Nicey: The End of an Era	BAFTA TV Award for Best Best Light Entertainment (Programme or Series)	Nominated
1999	Elizabeth	BAFTA Award for Best British Film	Won
1999	Elizabeth	Academy Award for Best Picture	Nominated
1999	Elizabeth	BAFTA Award for Best Film	Nominated
2010	Temple Grandin	Primetime Emmy Award for Outstanding Television Movie	Won
2010	Small Island	BAFTA TV Award for Best Drama Serial	Nominated
2011	Temple Grandin	Producers Guild of America Award for Best Long-Form Television	Nominated
2014	Saving Mr. Banks	BAFTA Award for Best British Film	Nominated
2014	Saving Mr. Banks	Producers Guild of America Award for Best Theatrical Motion Picture	Nominated
