= Alfie Allen =

English actor (born 1986)

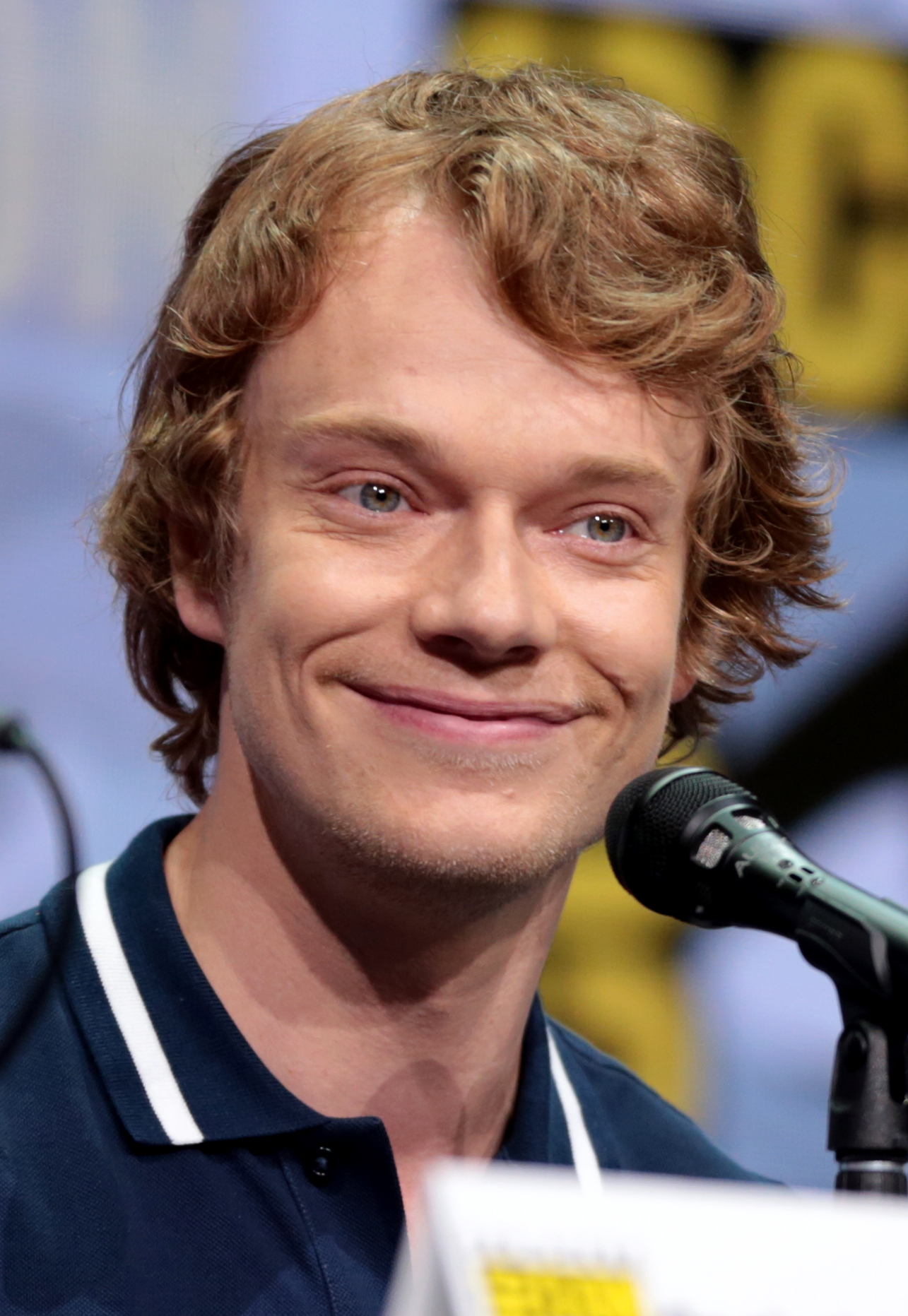
- Allen at the 2017 San Diego Comic-Con
- Born: Alfie Evan Allen; 12 September 1986 (age 40); Hammersmith, London, England
- Occupation: Actor
- Years active: 1998–present
- Partner: Allie Teilz (2017–2019)
- Children: 1
- Parents: Keith Allen; Alison Owen
- Relatives: Lily Allen (sister); Kevin Allen (uncle); Sam Smith (third cousin)

Alfie Evan Allen (born 12 September 1986) is an English actor. He portrayed Theon Greyjoy on all eight seasons of the HBO fantasy series Game of Thrones (2011–2019), for which he received a nomination for the Primetime Emmy Award for Outstanding Supporting Actor in a Drama Series in 2019. In film, he is best known for his starring roles in John Wick (2014), The Predator (2018), and Jojo Rabbit (2019).

== Early life and education ==
Alfie Evan Allen was born on 12 September 1986 in Hammersmith, London, the son of film producer Alison Owen and actor Keith Allen. His elder sister is singer Lily Allen; her song "Alfie" is about him. His uncle is actor Kevin Allen. He is a third cousin of singer Sam Smith. He attended Windlesham House School in Sussex, Embley Park School near Romsey, St John's College in Portsmouth, and the Fine Arts College in Hampstead, where he studied for his A-levels.

== Career ==
Allen's first professional appearance was in a one-off Channel 4 comedy, You Are Here in 1998, co-written by Matt Lucas and David Walliams. The same year, Allen and his sister Lily appeared in the 1998 film Elizabeth, which was produced by their mother.

His early work included small roles in Agent Cody Banks 2: Destination London, directed by his uncle, the film Atonement, and in BBC1's historical hospital drama, Casualty 1907, as Nobby Clark. Starting in Chichester on 31 January 2008, he took over Daniel Radcliffe's role in a revival of Equus on a nationwide tour.

In April 2009, Allen co-starred with then-partner Jaime Winstone in the music video for "Dust Devil" by Madness. He also had a role in the BBC2 film, Freefall. He continued to work in films, appearing in Freestyle, Soulboy, and The Kid in 2010.

Allen came to international attention when he was cast as Theon Greyjoy in the HBO fantasy series Game of Thrones, an adaptation of George R. R. Martin's A Song of Ice and Fire, in 2011. Originally auditioning for the role of Jon Snow, he appeared as a series regular for 8 seasons and was nominated for a Primetime Emmy Award for Best Supporting Actor in 2019 for the show's final season.

Allen starred in the 2012 British thriller Confine, and then opposite Keanu Reeves in the 2014 film John Wick. In 2016, directed by Mike Christie, he filmed a two part documentary for the History Channel titled Football: A Brief History, about the roots of association football. That same year, he played Ringwood in the BBC Two 1940s-set miniseries Close to the Enemy and joined the London production of Jesse Eisenberg's The Spoils at Trafalgar Studios.

Allen co-starred in the sci-fi sequel The Predator as Lynch in 2018, and Taika Waititi's Oscar-nominated dark comedy Jojo Rabbit as Finkel as well as the coming-of-age film How to Build a Girl as John Kite in 2019. He had a recurring role as Isaac Pincher in the third series of the period drama Harlots.

In 2020, Allen appeared in the ITV crime drama White House Farm as Brett Collins. Allen made his Broadway debut in 2022 when he took over the role of Mooney from Dan Stevens in Martin McDonagh's Hangmen at John Golden Theatre. For his performance, Allen received a Tony Award nomination for Best Featured Actor in a Play. In 2022, he starred as Lieutenant Jock Lewes in the BBC One World War II miniseries SAS: Rogue Heroes.

== Personal life ==
From 2017 to 2019, Allen was in a relationship with artist Allie Teilz, with whom he has a daughter, born in October 2018. He is a supporter of the English football club Arsenal.

== Filmography ==
Key
| † | Denotes projects that have not yet been released |

=== Film ===
| Year | Title | Role | Notes |
|---|---|---|---|
| 1998 | Elizabeth | Arundel's Son | |
| 2004 | Agent Cody Banks 2: Destination London | Berkhamp on Double Bass | |
| 2005 | Stoned | Harry | |
| 2006 | Sixty Six | Younger Tout | |
| 2007 | Cherries | James | Short film |
| 2007 | Atonement | Danny Hardman | |
| 2008 | The Other Boleyn Girl | King's Messenger | |
| 2008 | Flashbacks of a Fool | Kevin Hubble | |
| 2009 | Boogie Woogie | Photographer | |
| 2010 | Freestyle | Jez | |
| 2010 | Soulboy | Russ Mountjoy | |
| 2010 | The Kid | Dominic | |
| 2011 | Powder | Wheezer | |
| 2012 | Confine | Henry | |
| 2014 | Plastic | Yatesy | |
| 2014 | John Wick | Iosef Tarasov | |
| 2016 | Pandemic | Wheeler | |
| 2016 | Patient Seven | The Man | Anthology film; segment: "The Body" |
| 2018 | The Predator | Lynch | |
| 2019 | How to Build a Girl | John Kite | |
| 2019 | Jojo Rabbit | Finkel | |
| 2020 | Nightwalkers | —N/a | Short film |
| 2021 | La Cha Cha | Dooty Davies | |
| 2021 | Night Teeth | Victor | |
| 2023 | Young Hot Bloods | Sullivan | Short film |
| 2024 | McVeigh | Timothy McVeigh | |
| TBA | Visitation † | TBA | Post-production |
| TBA | Eleven Missing Days † | TBA | Post-production |

=== Television ===
| Year | Title | Role | Notes |
|---|---|---|---|
| 1988 | The Comic Strip Presents... | Child in Promo | Episode: "The Yob" |
| 1998 | You Are Here | Son | Television film |
| 1999 | Spaced | Skateboard Kid | Episode: "Ends" |
| 2005 | The Golden Hour | Clive | Episode: "Episode 4" |
| 2005 | Jericho | Albert Hall | Episode: "A Pair of Ragged Claws" |
| 2007 | Joe's Palace | Jason | Television film |
| 2008 | Casualty 1907 | Nobby Clark | Television miniseries |
| 2008 | Coming Up | Adams | Episode: "And Kill Them" |
| 2009 | Freefall | Ian | Television film |
| 2010 | Moving On | Dave | Episode: "Rules of the Game" |
| 2010 | Accused | Michael Lang | Episode: "Helen's Story" |
| 2011–2019 | Game of Thrones | Theon Greyjoy | 47 episodes |
| 2016 | Close to the Enemy | Ringwood | Television miniseries |
| 2017 | Football: A Brief History | Host | Television documentary |
| 2019 | Harlots | Isaac Pincher | 5 episodes |
| 2020 | White House Farm | Brett Collins | Television miniseries |
| 2022 | SAS: Rogue Heroes | Lieutenant Jock Lewes | 4 episodes |
| 2023 | Transformers: EarthSpark | Tarantulas (voice) | Episode: "Missed Connection" |
| 2025 | Safe Harbor | Tobias Chapman | 8 episodes |
| 2025 | Atomic | Max | 5 episodes |
| 2026 | Girl Taken | Rick Hansen | 6 episodes |
| TBA | 3 Body Problem † | TBA | Post-production |
| TBA | The Institute † | Nolan Reeves | Post-production |

== Theatre credits ==
| Year | Title | Role | Notes |
|---|---|---|---|
| 2008 | Equus | Alan | UK Tour |
| 2016 | The Spoils | Ben | Trafalgar Studios, London |
| 2022 | Hangmen | Mooney | John Golden Theatre, New York |
| 2025 | Dealer's Choice | Frankie | Donmar Warehouse, London |

== Awards and nominations ==
| Year | Award | Category | Work | Result | Ref. |
|---|---|---|---|---|---|
| 2011 | Scream Awards | Best Ensemble (shared with the cast) | Game of Thrones | Nominated | |
| 2012 | Screen Actors Guild Awards | Outstanding Performance by an Ensemble in a Drama Series (shared with the cast) | Game of Thrones | Nominated | |
| 2014 | Screen Actors Guild Awards | Outstanding Performance by an Ensemble in a Drama Series (shared with the cast) | Game of Thrones | Nominated | |
| 2015 | Screen Actors Guild Awards | Outstanding Performance by an Ensemble in a Drama Series (shared with the cast) | Game of Thrones | Nominated | |
| 2015 | Empire Awards | Empire Hero Award (shared with the cast) | Game of Thrones | Won | |
| 2016 | Screen Actors Guild Awards | Outstanding Performance by an Ensemble in a Drama Series (shared with the cast) | Game of Thrones | Nominated | |
| 2017 | Screen Actors Guild Awards | Outstanding Performance by an Ensemble in a Drama Series (shared with the cast) | Game of Thrones | Nominated | |
| 2019 | Primetime Emmy Awards | Outstanding Supporting Actor in a Drama Series | Game of Thrones | Nominated | |
| 2020 | Screen Actors Guild Awards | Outstanding Performance by an Ensemble in a Drama Series (shared with the cast) | Game of Thrones | Nominated | |
| 2020 | Screen Actors Guild Awards | Outstanding Cast in a Motion Picture (shared with the cast) | Jojo Rabbit | Nominated | |
| 2022 | Tony Awards | Best Featured Actor in a Play | Hangmen | Nominated | |
