= The Watcher in the Woods =

The Watcher in the Woods may refer to:

== Literature ==
- A Watcher in the Woods, a 1903 non-fiction book by Dallas Lore Sharp
- A Watcher in the Woods, a 1976 novel by Florence Engel Randall
- Watcher in the Woods, a 2019 novel by Kelley Armstrong
- Watchers in the Woods, a 1991 novel by William W. Johnstone

== Film and television ==
- The Watcher in the Woods (1980 film), an American supernatural horror film based on the 1976 novel
- The Watcher in the Woods (2017 film), an American made-for-television horror film
- "Chapter Sixteen: The Watcher in the Woods", Riverdale season 2, episode 3 (2017)

== See also ==
- A Walk in the Woods (disambiguation)
- Don't Go in the Woods (disambiguation)
- Hidden in the Woods (disambiguation)
- House in the Woods (disambiguation)
- Watcher in the Piney Woods, a 2000 American Girl novel by Elizabeth McDavid Jones
