= Levi Brown (actor) =

English actor

- Education: Guildhall School of Music and Drama
- Occupation: Actor
- Years active: 2022–present
- Television: This Town

Levi J. Brown is a British television actor and musician. He is known for his role as Dante Williams in the 2024 series This Town.

== Early life and education ==
Levi Brown is from Halesowen in the West Midlands and attended Windsor High School.

By 2018, he had moved to London, and graduated in 2021 from the Guildhall School of Music and Drama.

== Career ==
In 2022, Brown had a role in Channel 4 comedy series I Hate You, written by Robert Popper and featuring Tanya Reynolds, Melissa Saint, and Shaquille Ali-Yebuah.

Brown had a role in the 2021 Apple TV+ series Invasion. He played Jason Perry in ITV thriller series Payback in 2023.

Brown has the lead role as Dante Williams in 2024 Steven Knight series This Town for BBC One, premiering in the UK in March 2024. He received praise for his performance, with Anita Singh in The Daily Telegraph writing that he imbued his character "with a solemn, soulful quality...an impressive performance for a young actor".

Brown made his Royal Shakespeare Company debut in 2025, playing Christian de Neuvillette in its 2025 production of Cyrano de Bergerac.

Brown portrays Wes in the 2026 British drama series Girl Taken on Paramount+.

== Media appearances ==
Brown appeared as a guest on the Craig Charles show for BBC 6 Music in March 2024.

== Personal life ==
Brown plays the ukulele and learnt how to play the guitar too for the role of Dante, in the 2024 series This Town.

== Filmography ==
Year	Title	Role	Notes
2022	I Hate You	Two Time	
2023	Invasion	Soldier	
2023	Payback	Jason Perry	
2024	This Town	Dante Williams	Lead role
2026	Girl Taken	Wes	
