= Ben Rose =

Ben Rose may refer to:

- Ben Rose (photographer)
- Ben Rose (actor)
- Waldo Rose, known as Ben, member of the Ohio House of Representatives
