= This Town (soundtrack) =

Soundtrack album by various artists
- Released: 26 April 2024
- Genre: Soundtrack; ska; reggae; pop
- Length: 34:49
- Label: Polydor (United Kingdom)

This Town (Music from the Original BBC Series) is a soundtrack by various artists of the 2024 BBC One TV miniseries, This Town. It was released on 26 April 2024 by Polydor Records on CD, and as an LP pressed on blue vinyl and clear vinyl. The album's release coincided with the broadcast of the TV show's final episode on BBC One on 28 April 2024.

The miniseries was created by British screenwriter and film director Steven Knight. It takes place in the United Kingdom during the two-tone ska revival in the 1980s. The show's soundtrack features songs by various artists, including UB40, the Clash and Desmond Dekker, covers of songs recorded for the show by several musicians, including Self Esteem, Gregory Porter and Sekou, and songs written for the show and performed by show's actors.

== Content ==
This Town (Music from the Original BBC Series) was released by Polydor Records in association with Mercury Studios on 26 April 2024, and features selected music from the TV show's soundtrack. It comprises six covers of previously released songs, and five new songs written for the show.

"You Can Get It If You Really Want", a 1995 reggae song by Jamaican musician, Jimmy Cliff, was covered by Sheffield singer, Self Esteem. Other covers on the album are "Somewhere Over the Rainbow" by English record producer and musician Ray Laurél, "The Harder They Come" by English neo soul singer Olivia Dean, "Blue Moon" by English singer Celeste, "The World (Is Going Up in Flames)" by American musician Gregory Porter, and another Cliff song, "Wonderful World, Beautiful People" by English singer Sekou.

The album's new songs were written for the show by English record producer and songwriter Dan Carey and English poet Kae Tempest. They were performed by actors in the show in the ska band they started called Fuck the Factory.

== Reception ==
In a review in NME, Liberty Dunworth described the soundtrack as "an eclectic mix of artists putting their own spin on songs from the era in a bid to pay tribute to the hugely formative period." They called Self Esteem's version of "You Can Get It If You Really Want" a "sonic new cover" that puts "a modern, dance spin on the original". Also writing in NME, Anagricel Duran described the soundtrack as a "genre-wide mix of timeless anthems, original songs, and iconic hits set in the world of ska and two-tone in the early ’80s."

Marc Robinson of Mercury Studios described Polydor's vinyl artwork as "beautiful", and said that Celeste "just nailed" "Blue Moon". Alfie Jones writing in whynow called Celeste's cover of "Blue Moon" "stunningly evocative".

== Track listing ==
=== LP release ===
Side one
No.	Title	Artist	Length
1.	"You Can Get It If You Really Want"	Self Esteem	3:51
2.	"Somewhere Over the Rainbow"	Ray Laurél	4:27
3.	"Estella"	Fuck the Factory	2:23
4.	"The Harder They Come"	Olivia Dean	3:50
5.	"Birdsong"	Fuck the Factory	2:44

Side two
No.	Title	Artist	Length
1.	"Pelicans"	Fuck the Factory	2:26
2.	"Blue Moon"	Celeste	2:34
3.	"Farewell, To Matty and Her Flowers"	Fuck the Factory	2:56
4.	"The World (Is Going Up in Flames)"	Gregory Porter	3:24
5.	"This Town"	Fuck the Factory	2:45
6.	"Wonderful World, Beautiful People"	Sekou	3:29

=== CD release ===
Side one
No.	Title	Artist	Length
1.	"You Can Get It If You Really Want"	Self Esteem	3:51
2.	"Somewhere Over The Rainbow"	Ray Laurél	4:27
3.	"Estella"	Fuck The Factory	2:23
4.	"The Harder They Come"	Olivia Dean	3:50
5.	"Birdsong"	Fuck The Factory	2:44
6.	"Pelicans"	Fuck The Factory	2:26
7.	"Blue Moon"	Celeste	2:34
8.	"Farewell, To Matty And Her Flowers"	Fuck The Factory	2:56
9.	"The World (Is Going Up In Flames)"	Gregory Porter	3:24
10.	"This Town"	Fuck The Factory	2:45
11.	"Wonderful World, Beautiful People"	Sekou	3:29

== Original score ==
This Town's original score composed by Kormac was released by Globe Soundtrack & Score on 10 May 2024.
