= Call the Midwife: Sisters in Arms =

- Genre: Period drama
- Created by: Heidi Thomas
- Starring: Julie Hesmondhalgh; Amy Booth-Steel; Helen Schlesinger; Helena Wilson; Bally Gill; Liv Andrusier; Lizzie Back; Ellie Mckay; Ciaran Bowling; Ami Metcalf; Ben Rose
- Narrated by: Jenny Agutter
- Country of origin: United Kingdom
- Original language: English
- No. of seasons: 1
- No. of episodes: 3

Production
- Executive producers: Pippa Harris; Heidi Thomas
- Producer: Ann Tricklebank
- Running time: 60 minutes
- Production company: Neal Street Productions

Original release
- Network: BBC One (United Kingdom)
- Release: 2026

Related
- Call the Midwife

Call the Midwife: Sisters in Arms is an upcoming British period drama television series that will serve as a prequel to Call the Midwife. It will follow a group of nurse midwives working in the East End of London during World War Two.

The TV series will be produced by Neal Street Productions with Call the Midwife creator and executive producer Heidi Thomas serving as the show's writer and executive producer alongside Pippa Harris. It is set to premiere initially as a three-part mini-series in Christmas 2026, with a feature-length series to air at a later date.

== Premise ==
In September 1939, Nonnatus House is the beating heart of the East End community of Poplar. The nurses and nuns dedicate their lives to mothers, babies and the poor. But there is no gas and air, no penicillin, no cure for TB and no welfare state. Then war is declared - and life gets even harder.

While bombs rain from the sky, women give birth underground, families are shattered and whole streets are reduced to ruins.

== Cast and characters ==
=== Main cast ===
- Julie Hesmondhalgh as Sister Alice
- Amy Booth-Steel as Sister Evangelina
- Helen Schlesinger as Sister Monica Joan
- Helena Wilson and Jenny Agutter (narration) as Sister Julienne
- Bally Gill as Dr. Kit Malhotra
- Liv Andrusier as Nurse Marianne Siegler
- Lizzie Back as Nurse Sybil Maxted
- Ellie Mckay as Nurse Olive Dobbs
- Ciaran Bowling as Fred Buckle
- Ami Metcalf as Betty Buckle
- Ben Rose as Dr. Patrick Turner

=== Guest cast ===
- Martin McCann as Tommy Moffat
- Rachel O'Connell as Mary Moffat
