= Shaquille Ali-Yebuah =

British actor

- Born: 26 May 1995 (age 31); Hammersmith, London, England
- Occupation: Actor
- Years active: 2013–present
- Known for: iBoy; The First Team; Death in Paradise

Shaquille Ali-Yebuah (born 26 May 1995) is a British actor.

== Early life ==
Ali-Yebuah is from London. He trained with Identity School of Acting.

== Career ==
In 2013, Ali-Yebuah was cast to play a young Steven K Amos in BBC Radio 4's What Does the K Stand For?, and also appeared in Miles Jupp's In and Out of the Kitchen, also distributed by the same network.

He went on to pursue numerous British television roles, including CBBC's Dixi, Casualty, You, Me, and the Apocalypse, and a Nike advert for the 2014 FIFA World Cup as part of the "Winner Stays On" campaign, which ended up being the highest viewed commercial on YouTube with over 118 million views and racked up 20 million views within 4 days.

In 2017, he appeared in a Netflix original film entitled iBoy, an action thriller also starring Miranda Richardson, Rory Kinnear, Maisie Williams and Bill Milner. As well, he appeared in The Children Act, a film directed by Richard Eyre and featuring Emma Thompson, as well as Social Suicide and a role in Solo: A Star Wars Story.

2020 saw him appear in The First Team, a football based comedy series from the creators of The Inbetweeners, portraying the role of Benji Achebe, a young footballer on the fringes of the first team squad in love with the trappings of being a footballer.

In 2021, he became the face of UK Mobile operator O2’s latest television advert.

In 2023, he had a role in Channel 4 comedy series I Hate You, written by Robert Popper and featuring Tanya Reynolds and Melissa Saint.

In 2025, he joined the main cast of BBC One series Death in Paradise as Officer Sebastien (Seb) Rose.
