= Tallulah Evans =

British actress (born 2000)

- Born: Tallulah Rose Evans; 4 April 2000 (age 26); London
- Education: Royal Welsh College of Music and Drama (BA)
- Occupation: Actress
- Years active: 2006–present
- Father: Marcus Evans

Tallulah Rose Evans (born 4 April 2000) is an English actress. She began her career as a child actress in the films Son of Rambow (2007), Molly Moon and the Incredible Book of Hypnotism (2015), and the Lifetime film The Watcher in the Woods (2017). More recently, she starred in the Paramount+ series Girl Taken (2026).

== Early life ==
Evans was born in central London and is the eldest daughter of Marcus Evans, former chairman of Ipswich Town FC, and Elizabeth. She has two younger sisters, including Delphi (born 2002).

Evans attended Putney High School, completing her A Levels in 2018. She graduated with a Bachelor of Arts (BA) in Acting from the Royal Welsh College of Music & Drama in 2021.

== Career ==
Evans made her feature film debut with a minor role in the 2006 film Penelope. This was followed by roles as Jess Proudfoot in the 2007 comedy Son of Rambow and Jemima in the 2009 sequel St Trinian's 2: The Legend of Fritton's Gold.

In 2015, Evans played Davina Nuttel in the fantasy film adaptation of Molly Moon and the Incredible Book of Hypnotism. She made her television debut in the 2017 Lifetime film The Watcher in the Woods as Jan Carstairs. Evans had her first recurring television role as Jenny Walker in the 2020 Netflix series White Lines.

Evans returned to film in 2023, starring as Lexy in the sequel Winnie-the-Pooh: Blood and Honey 2. She also appeared in two episodes of the Disney+ series The Full Monty as Lucy Warner and an episode of the three-episode Channel 5 crime drama Ellis as Carrie Booth.

In 2025, Evans played Haley in the Amazon Prime film My Fault: London and Olivia Carteret in the Channel 5 period drama and adaptation of The Forsytes. In 2026, Evans starred as Lily Riser in the Paramount+ thriller series Girl Taken alongside her younger sister Delphi.

== Filmography ==
=== Film ===
Year	Title	Role	Notes
2006	Penelope	Little Girl in Photobooth	
2007	Son of Rambow	Jess Proudfoot	
2009	St Trinian's 2: The Legend of Fritton's Gold	Jemima	
2011	David Rose	Stella	Short film
2015	Molly Moon and the Incredible Book of Hypnotism	Davina Nuttel	
2021	On Island West	Arya	Short film
2024	Winnie-the-Pooh: Blood and Honey 2	Lexy	
2025	My Fault: London	Haley	Amazon Prime film

=== Television ===
Year	Title	Role	Notes
2017	The Watcher in the Woods	Jan Carstairs	Television film
2020	White Lines	Jenny Walker	3 episodes
2023	The Full Monty	Lucy Warner	2 episodes
2024	Ellis	Carrie Booth	Episode: "Hanmore"
2025	The Forsytes	Olivia Carteret	3 episodes
2026	Girl Taken	Lily Riser	Main role
