= Timestalker =

2024 British film by Alice Lowe

- Theatrical release poster
- Directed by: Alice Lowe
- Written by: Alice Lowe
- Produced by: Alice Lowe; Mark Hopkins; Tom Wood; Vaughan Sivell; Natan Stoessel
- Starring: Alice Lowe; Jacob Anderson; Nick Frost; Aneurin Barnard; Tanya Reynolds; Mike Wozniak; Kate Dickie; Dan Skinner
- Cinematography: Ryan Eddleston
- Edited by: Matyas Fekete; Chris Dickens
- Music by: Toydrum
- Production companies: BFI; Head Gear Films; Ffilm Cymru Wales; Western Edge Pictures; Popcorn Group
- Distributed by: Vertigo Releasing
- Release dates: 8 March 2024 (SXSW); 11 October 2024 (United Kingdom and Ireland)
- Running time: 90 minutes
- Country: United Kingdom
- Language: English

Timestalker is a 2024 British historical science fiction romantic comedy film written, directed by, and starring Alice Lowe, with Jacob Anderson, Aneurin Barnard, Tanya Reynolds, and Nick Frost in supporting roles. The film follows Agnes, a woman who falls in love with the same man again and again over several lives across more than three centuries.

== Plot ==
In 1688, the priest of an unorthodox congregation in western Scotland is arrested for heresy. Agnes, a witness to his execution, becomes enamoured by him and tries to save him. Agnes is inadvertently struck by an axe, and the priest, Alex, takes the opportunity to escape. Scipio, an onlooker, draws the scene. As she dies, Agnes promises she will see Alex again.

In 1793, Agnes has been reborn and lives in the English countryside. She confides to her handmaiden Meg about her dissatisfaction with her life, constantly under the heel of her domineering husband George. One day, she finds Alex, now a highwayman. Despite seemingly striking a romance with him, Alex steals Agnes' necklace, an heirloom from George's family, prompting George to threaten to hang him. Scipio, now a servant to the couple, encourages Agnes to stand against George, who burns her books in retaliation. At a masquerade ball, Agnes meets Alex amongst the guests, but he insists privately that he cannot take her to France with him. George catches them and furiously drags Agnes back to his house. Agnes declares that she will return, to which George threatens he will hunt Agnes "until the end of time" and swiftly beheads her.

In 1847, Agnes, now a schoolteacher, is passed by a man she recognises as Alex. Following him, she narrowly saves him from an oncoming carriage, but is again beheaded.

In 1940, George and Agnes are a magician and his assistant during the Blitz. During a performance, Agnes notices that Alex is a soldier in the audience. When George recognises Alex, he again attacks her after Alex responds to a raid siren.

In 1980, Agnes has come to Manhattan to find Alex, now a pop star, to Meg's chagrin. She regularly receives counsel from a shrink, who tells her that she lived several lifetimes because of something she is lacking. Meeting with Scipio, Alex's manager, Agnes denies her obsession with him, while Scipio expresses his anger at Alex for using his songs without credit. They are briefly interrupted by hearing of John Lennon's murder. When the shrink suggests that she should "turn the tables", Agnes confronts Alex after a concert, only for him to insist that she is his stalker. Scipio, rather than saving Alex, asks if she will be a "revolutionary". Agnes relents, saying she is only a fan, and leaves.

Receiving proper psychological support, Agnes is told that her obsession was a delusion. Falling back on George, who has himself observed her, Agnes nearly marries him, but when George remembers Alex from forty years earlier, he stabs her in the chest. Agnes pleads that George let her go and that she wants him to be who he wants himself. Given his experiences in his current life, George has a change of heart and relents. Hallucinating meeting Scipio, who shows her his drawing and claims that she has died for the final time, Agnes releases her fixation on Alex and recognises that Meg has shown her love the entire time. Returning to life, Agnes arrives at Alex's failing concert, telling him she will set themselves free, and embraces him before shooting him and herself in the head.

In a dystopian 2117, Agnes and Meg are a couple and with Scipio and George are part of a resistance movement against an unspecified power. As the rebels charge at a group of paramilitary officers, Agnes pauses when one officer unmasks himself as Alex. He tells her that he loves her, compelling Agnes to retreat.

== Cast ==
- Alice Lowe as Agnes
- Jacob Anderson as Scipio
- Nick Frost as George
- Tanya Reynolds as Meg
- Aneurin Barnard as Alex
- Kate Dickie as Marion
- Dan Renton Skinner as Officer/Priest
- Mike Wozniak as Dan Chovy

== Production ==
In February 2021, it was announced that Lowe's new project was called Timestalker and was a romantic comedy about one woman's unrequited love across centuries from 1680s western Scotland through to an apocalyptic 22nd century. It had Sam Riley, Jacob Anderson and Natasia Demetriou attached to it with Lowe also acting. Vaughan Sivell was announced as producing for Western Edge Pictures and HanWay handling international sales. In October 2022, it was announced that filming had commenced with Nick Frost, Tanya Reynolds, Aneurin Barnard, Kate Dickie, Dan Skinner, and Mike Wozniak in the cast and Riley and Demetriou no longer involved. Popcorn Group were on board as co-producers with funding coming from the BFI, Head Gear Films, and Ffilm Cymru Wales with funding from the National Lottery and the Welsh Government via Creative Wales. HanWay Films released first look images of Frost and Lowe in historical costume in February 2023.

== Release ==
Timestalker had its world premiere at South by Southwest on 8 March 2024. The film had its Canadian premiere at the 28th Fantasia International Film Festival on 31 July 2024. In June 2024, Vertigo Releasing acquired distribution rights to the film for the United Kingdom and Ireland from HanWay Films.

The film was released theatrically in the United Kingdom and Ireland on 11 October 2024. It was released digitally on video-on-demand (VOD) platforms the following month.

== Reception ==
On the review aggregator website Rotten Tomatoes, 87% of 47 critics' reviews are positive, with an average rating of 6.9/10. The website's consensus reads: "Leveraging fantasy to explore how bad life choices are evergreen, Timestalker is a clever and imaginative sophomore feature from director and star Alice Lowe." Metacritic, which uses a weighted average, assigned the film a score of 72 out of 100, based on 14 critics, indicating "generally favorable" reviews.
