= The First Team (TV series) =

UK television comedy series

- Genre: Comedy
- Created by: Damon Beesley; Iain Morris
- Written by: Damon Beesley; Iain Morris
- Directed by: Damon Beesley; Iain Morris
- Starring: Jake Short; Shaquille Ali-Yebuah; Jack McMullen; Will Arnett; Chris Geere; Theo Barklem-Biggs; Tamla Kari
- Country of origin: United Kingdom
- Original language: English
- No. of series: 1
- No. of episodes: 6

Production
- Executive producers: Damon Beesley; Caroline Leddy; Iain Morris; Gregor Sharp; Tom Werner
- Producer: Sam Pinnell
- Cinematography: Simon Tindall
- Editors: Charlie Fawcett; William Webb
- Running time: 27–30 minutes
- Production companies: BBC Studios; Fudge Park Productions

Original release
- Network: BBC Two; BBC iPlayer
- Release: 28 May – 2 July 2020

The First Team (stylised as The F1rst Team) is a British comedy television series, created by Damon Beesley and Iain Morris, both well known for their work on The Inbetweeners. The series follows the lives of Mattie Sullivan (Jake Short), Benji Achebe (Shaquille Ali-Yebuah) and Jack Turner (Jack McMullen), who are young players of a fictional Premier League football team.

Produced by BBC Studios and the creators' production company Fudge Park Productions, the sole series began broadcasting on BBC Two on 28 May 2020, consisting of six episodes, concluding on 2 July the same year. The series received mixed reviews by critics.

== Plot ==
Focusing on the lives of young players Mattie, Jack and Benji, the show follows the trio as they contend with the manifold issues on and off the field that are associated with modern-day football. One of the overriding themes of the show, according to Beesley, is the "fault lines, where masculinity and insecurity collide".

== Cast and characters ==
=== Main ===
- Jake Short as Mattie Sullivan
- Shaquille Ali-Yebuah as Benji Achebe
- Jack McMullen as Jack Turner
- Will Arnett as Mark Crane
- Chris Geere as Chris Booth
- Theo Barklem-Biggs as Petey Brooks
- Tamla Kari as Olivia Talbot

=== Recurring ===
- Paolo Sassanelli as Cesare
- Jason Williamson as Kitman Martin
- Vadhir Derbez as Carlos Velez
- Ossian Perret as Pascal
- Phil Wang as Brian
- Marek Larwood as Holehead
- Joe Sims as Paul Williamson
- Neil Fitzmaurice as Darren Turner
- Marvin Brown as Bootz

=== Guest ===
- Gary Lineker as himself
- Alan Shearer as himself (uncredited)
- Ian Wright as himself (uncredited)
- Jürgen Klopp as himself
- Sally Nugent as herself
- Jonathan Pearce as himself (voice only)
- Paul Hawksbee as himself (voice only)
- Andy Jacobs as himself (voice only)

== Production ==
=== Development ===
The series was created by Damon Beesley and Iain Morris, who were notable for producing the famous E4 comedy television series The Inbetweeners. The series, entitled The First Team, was reported to be focused on the lives of players in a fictional Premier League football team, similar to the format of former ITV drama television programme Footballers' Wives. The programme's crew was mainly made up of former members of The Inbetweeners crew, with Beesley and Morris' self-constructed production company Fudge Park Productions collaborating with BBC Studios to produce the series.

=== Casting ===
In September 2019, the cast was confirmed, with Jake Short, Shaquille Ali-Yebuah and Jack McMullen set to star. This was the first British production in which Short had appeared - he was previously known for his work for Disney Channel in the United States (although Short's previous Disney Channel appearances had been broadcast to viewers in the British Isles on Disney Channel UK and Ireland and Disney XD UK and Ireland respectively). It was Ali-Yebuah's first lead role in both television and film.

Theo Barklem-Biggs and Tamla Kari were cast in supporting roles, both having appeared in previous Beesley and Morris projects: Barklem-Biggs in The Inbetweeners Movie and Kari in both this and The Inbetweeners 2. Other notable cast members included Will Arnett, Phil Wang and Neil Fitzmaurice.

=== Filming ===
The series was filmed across the United Kingdom. The football stadium and training complex were filmed at Charlton Athletic Football Club's facilities: The Valley and their Sparrows Lane training complex. Furthermore, a fan of the programme stated that they had witnessed the programme also being filmed in a local Charlton pub named The Rose of Denmark.

When filming in Chester, England international footballer Raheem Sterling was seen at the same Costco store where the crew were filming. It appeared that Sterling was a friend of Shaquille Ali-Yebuah, who portrays the role of Benji Achebe. The scenes where the three main characters visit Petey Brooks's (Theo Barklem-Biggs) home was filmed at a private residence in Sevenoaks, Kent.

== Episodes ==
No. overall	No. in series	Title	Directed by	Written by	Original release date	UK viewers (millions)
1	1	"Selling Shirts"	Damon Beesley; Iain Morris	Damon Beesley; Iain Morris	28 May 2020	N/A
New signing Mattie arrives. Meanwhile, club hardman Petey takes a dislike to him, and a team-mate shares an embarrassing problem.
2	2	"New Friends"	Damon Beesley; Iain Morris	Damon Beesley; Iain Morris	4 June 2020	N/A
Mattie befriends the team's star player Carlos Velez. Meanwhile, Jack plucks up courage to date a girl he met online, and Benji is approached by a mysterious Malaysian businessman.
3	3	"Octopus Situation"	Damon Beesley; Iain Morris	Damon Beesley; Iain Morris	11 June 2020	N/A
After a sexual conduct briefing, Mattie, Benji and Jack are determined to keep out of trouble, but a chance meeting with friendly Nicola leads to a very tricky situation.
4	4	"International Break"	Damon Beesley; Iain Morris	Damon Beesley; Iain Morris	18 June 2020	N/A
Petey insists that Mattie, Jack and Benji come to his BBQ. Meanwhile Jack's dad oversteps the mark with his online posts and Cesare's job as manager starts to look uncertain.
5	5	"Pints of Sorry"	Damon Beesley; Iain Morris	Damon Beesley; Iain Morris	25 June 2020	N/A
The Chairman announces a caretaker manager. After a poor start the team is forced to attend a pub night as an apology to the fans. Benji employs a social media manager.
6	6	"Upheaval"	Damon Beesley; Iain Morris	Damon Beesley; Iain Morris	2 July 2020	N/A
Petey plots to bring an end to Chris Booth's run of success. Meanwhile Jack gets a girlfriend and plans a romantic surprise. Benji has had enough of his social media manager.

== Reception ==
The show received mixed reviews after its release, being dubbed "a football sitcom fit for relegation", with 2/5 star reviews in both The Guardian and The Radio Times. The review from The Evening Standard, however, was more positive, asserting that despite a slow start, by episode two, the series "feels a lot more confident and funny".

== See also ==
- Ted Lasso, American sitcom featuring an American manager who joins a Premier League club
