= Look Around You =

Television comedy series

- Look Around You Series 1 logo
- Genre: Comedy; parody
- Created by: Robert Popper; Peter Serafinowicz
- Written by: Robert Popper; Peter Serafinowicz
- Directed by: Tim Kirkby
- Starring: Peter Serafinowicz; Robert Popper; Olivia Colman (series 2); Josie D'Arby (series 2)
- Narrated by: Nigel Lambert (series 1)
- Country of origin: United Kingdom
- No. of series: 2
- No. of episodes: 15

Production
- Editors: Chris Dickens (series 1); Paul Machliss (series 2); Jonathan Amos (series 2)
- Running time: 10 minutes (series 1); 30 minutes (series 2)
- Production companies: Mivvin Colour; Talkback Productions

Original release
- Network: BBC Two
- Release: 10 October 2002 – 7 March 2005

Look Around You is a comedic parody of British science television shows, devised and written by Robert Popper and Peter Serafinowicz, and narrated in the first series by Nigel Lambert. The first series of eight 10-minute shorts was shown in 2002, and the second series of six 30-minute episodes in 2005, both on BBC Two. The first series of Look Around You was nominated for a BAFTA award in 2003.

== Series 1 ==
In the first series, the episodes ("modules") satirise and pay homage to early 1980s educational films and school programmes such as ITV Schools' Experiment series and BBC's "For Schools and Colleges". A different scientific subject is covered in each episode.

The modules are, in order of transmission date:

1. "Calcium" (pilot, double episode)
2. "Maths"
3. "Water"
4. "Germs"
5. "Ghosts"
6. "Sulphur"
7. "Music"
8. "Iron"
9. "The Brain"

The humour is derived from a combination of patent nonsense and faithful references and homages. For instance, fictional items that have a passing resemblance to everyday objects are shown and discussed. Such items include the "boîte diabolique", a box at the top of a piano scale which houses the "forbidden notes"; and "Garry gum", a performance-enhancing chewing gum which has the unfortunate side-effect of inducing diarrhoea, necessitating the consumption of "anti-Garry gum". Each episode begins with a "countdown clock", similar to the one used on ITV Schools programmes from 1979 to 1987. The music that accompanies the countdown is in the same spirit as the original, but is played on a solo guitar, and at the beginning of the "Brain" module, the guitarist can be heard tuning.

The module subjects are distorted beyond recognition; for instance, germs are described as coming from Germany, and whisky is said to be made by combining water with nitrogen. The maths module features a distorted and inaccurate version of the ancient "seven cats" puzzle by Ahmes. Additionally, subjects are mixed: for example, a chemistry experiment about eggs (in the episode "Water") turns into a French language lesson. Each episode follows a general format, beginning with an introduction to the subject, followed by a series of silly experiments performed by the hapless (and normally mute) scientists, played by Popper, Serafinowicz and Edgar Wright, among others.

The colour and overall look of the film was purposefully altered to replicate 1980s television for schools, and passably authentic incidental music written by Serafinowicz and Popper under the pseudonym "Gelg" was overdubbed to complete the parody of the original programmes.

A running gag throughout the series is the fastidious labelling of all items in Dymo tape, such as hairdryers, magnets, a bottle of maths, or a jar of nuts (containing both types of nut: the foodstuff and fastener). Another recurring joke is the use of fictional apparatus and materials used in the experiments—items such as the "Besselheim plate" poke fun at real lab equipment, often named after their designers (e.g. Petri dish, Erlenmeyer flask). Pencils are always used to point at key elements of the experiments, as the "scientists" do not speak: this is sometimes taken to ridiculous levels—pointing out pencils using a pencil; pointing at chocolates and then at a person to show they are a gift. Also, the series repeatedly instructs viewers to keep a notebook, described as a "copy book", and to inscribe random and essentially worthless details of the lessons taking place with the spoken instruction to "note that down in your copy book."

The series was commissioned based on a 20-minute pilot episode (twice the length of an episode in the first series, but otherwise identical) in which calcium is described as an amorphous gel prepared by grinding discarded teeth in massive milling machines; this is included on the DVD release of Series 1 as an "advanced double-length module".

The DVD extras also include a music video for the song "Little Mouse" (as featured in the module on music), a selection of mock-Ceefax pages, and a creator's commentary. The joke is taken even further by presenting the DVD subtitles in exactly the same format as those broadcast via teletext.

At the end of each episode, reference is made to the "next module"—although these episodes were never actually made. The episodes that are promised but never seen are:

- "Champagne"
- "Cosmetics"
- "Dynamite"
- "Flowers"
- "Hitchhiking"
- "Italians"
- "Reggae"
- "Romance"

On the DVD Ceefax pages, there are also two unseen modules:

- "Blood"
- "Further Maths"

== Series 2 ==
The second series is composed of six 30-minute episodes and is presented in the pop-science vein of programmes such as Tomorrow's World. The series was directed by Tim Kirkby, and Ash Atalla (producer of The Office) worked as executive producer. Running from 31 January to 7 March 2005 on BBC Two at 10 p.m., Series 2 comprised the following episodes:

1. "Music 2000"
2. "Health"
3. "Sport"
4. "Food"
5. "Computers"
6. "Live Invention of the Year Final"

The DVD commentary confirms that this was not the intended order, explaining why some running gags appear to build inconsistently.

According to the audio commentary, the programme is set around 1980–1981. To reinforce the show's retro look, each episode's opening continuity announcement (typically narrated by Serafinowicz, who exaggerated the sound of his breathing and mouth movements to simulate the effect of the microphones used at that time) played over the three-dimensional BBC Two ident from 1979 to 1986. Unlike the first series, which is 16:9 widescreen, the second series is presented in 4:3 to emulate the television format used in the early '80s. Additionally, location footage was shot on 16mm film, of the type used for location filming at the time. Episode 1 features a Top of the Pops introduction complete with the real TOTP theme music from the early 1980s, Yellow Pearl by Phil Lynott.

Features such as the song contest in the "Music 2000" episode also ground the series in the 1980s. Contestants showcase the futuristic songs they believe we could expect to hear in the far-off year 2000. Runners-up "Machadaynu", performed by Tony Rudd (played by Kevin Eldon) and Antony Carmichael's "The Rapping Song" are beaten in the contest by Toni Baxter's track, "Sexual Interface".

Unlike the first series, Series 2 contains dialogue between the four presenters and their guests, leaving behind both the narrated style of the first series and the anonymity given to the scientists. Serafinowicz plays Peter Packard, whilst Popper plays Jack Morgan, a character originally seen in series one as an experimenter performing the song "Little Mouse". There are also two additional presenters, Pam Bachelor and Pealy Maghti, played by Olivia Colman and Josie D'Arby respectively.

Several running gags from the first series are reprised in Series 2, such as references to Imhotep (pictured, as in the first series, as a moai), bassoons, and the use of portmanteaux, in phrases such as "Thanks, ants. Thants", or as in the Music episode, "Thanks Tchaikovsky. Thankovsky". In the final episode, this word-play culminates with Packard addressing two security guards, both named Hank, with the phrase "Thanks, Hanks. Thanks." Another running joke centres on characters such as Synthesizer Patel in the "Music" episode and Computer Jones in the "Computers" episode, who like an item to such a degree that they have changed their names.

Whereas the modules in Series 1 were wholly discrete, there is a measure of continuity throughout the episodes of Series 2. Each week, inventors (played by a number of British comic actors) showcase their new products, culminating in the live final programme where a winning invention is chosen, supposedly by "HRH, Sir Prince Charles". To achieve this fake presentation, archive footage of Prince Charles was blended with Look Around You footage, whilst Serafinowicz dubs the Prince's real voice with his own lip-synced impression of it.

=== DVD extras ===
DVD extras include a quiz, mock pages from Ceefax, an alternative "Birds of Britain" feature, the Scary Picture, which features a comically large succession of warning screens making sure the viewer actually wants to view it, before suddenly showing it at the same time as hearing a male scream, being shown without the scream in 2 episodes of Series 2, and the Test Card (a music video). Watching this to the end, including the credits, triggers an Easter egg featuring Jack Morgan's more realistic reaction to his plastic surgery, in which the Look Around You team are shocked at the modifications to Jack's face when Dr. Fu (played by Benedict Wong) reveals him to them. When handed a mirror, Jack turns to Dr. Fu and starts shouting expletives at him (the sole reason for the 15 rating on the DVD), but then calms down after stating that it was the initial reaction to the surgery.

== Production ==
- A running joke in Series 2 is that all guests, when introduced, enter through a series of large blast doors (similar to those from Get Smart). However, these were filmed against a bluescreen which gave an inferior effect, and the creators stated, on the DVD commentary, that they did not like the joke but felt they were "stuck with it".
- Leonard Hatred's funny walk was not scripted—it was improvised by Mark Heap. His encounter with Championess in the finale of the second series was also improvised.
- The "Computers" episode featured clips of fake 1980s computer games created by members of b3ta. Games included "Diarrhea Dan".

== Broadcast ==
When aired on BBC America from 2003 to 2008, episodes were edited to fit within a 30-minute time slot with adverts. This triggered a continuity error with the series: Leonard Hatred's initial segment was cut from the first episode, causing him to appear without explanation in the series finale.

The series ran on Adult Swim from 2009 to 2011.

Robert Popper reprised the role of his Look Around You character, Jack Morgan, for an appearance in the music video of the Frankie & The Heartstrings song "Hunger" (2011). Jack is seen hosting a Blue Peter-type programme, and introduces the song.

== Reception ==
The series was praised for its attention to detail. The Simpsons' creator Matt Groening called it "one of the funniest shows I've ever seen".

On 13 January 2012 Look Around You had its 10th anniversary celebrated by a showing of all episodes of the first series at the BFI Southbank in London. Peter Serafinowicz also released a new short clip entitled "Intermission".
