= A Watcher in the Woods =

1976 novel by Florence Engel Randall

- First edition cover art
- Author: Florence Engel Randall
- Language: English
- Genre: Young adult fiction, science fiction, Gothic, mystery
- Published: 1976 Atheneum Books
- Publication place: United States
- Media type: Print (Hardcover)
- Pages: 229
- ISBN: 0-689-30511-7
- OCLC: 1530915
- LC Class: PZ7.R1565 Wat

A Watcher in the Woods is a 1976 mystery novel by Florence Engel Randall that was published by Atheneum Books.

It was re-released by Scholastic Book Services in 1980 with a new title, The Watcher in the Woods (ISBN 0-590-31334-7) to tie-in with Walt Disney Studios' film adaptation with this new, slightly altered name.

== Plot ==
Fifteen year old Jan Carstairs is the narrator. Her family moved from Ohio to a small town in Massachusetts, where her father has accepted a teaching position at a local college. They live in a big old brick and stucco house in the country, which borders on a forest.

The previous owner, Mrs. Aylwood lives nearby. Fifty years earlier, her fifteen-year-old daughter, Karen, disappeared in the woods.

They bought the house. Jan had known they would. It was her mother's kind of house. Yet it was Jan who had made the purchase possible. Mrs. Aylwood, who was selling the house only because she had to, had talked to Jan and said, "I'll have to take a chance on you." What chance was that?

Moving in, Jan felt the watcher still, but the only concrete evidence was a rash of broken mirrors-all with a large X across the middle. Not until the family went on a picnic near the old pond on the property did more clues come, and then they came as puzzles to be solved, as mysteries to be understood, as incredible facts to be absorbed, and as desperate need begging for prompt action.

== Characters ==
- Janet (Jan) Carstairs: the fifteen-year-old daughter, she had the ability to "sense" the Watcher. The main protagonist of the story, she struggles diligently to find out who or what the Watcher is.
- Eleanor (Ellie) Carstairs: the seven-year-old daughter, she has the ability to "hear" the Watcher, but when she transcribes the Watcher's messages, they appear in a form of mirror writing (reversed). She becomes the Watcher as her sister reverses the happenings of the night she went missing.
- Professor Paul Carstairs: the father of the family, it was his acceptance of a position at a Massachusetts university that caused the family to move from Ohio. Along with Jan, he is witness to the Watcher's ability to communicate using a television set. He's fond of midnight snacks.
- Mrs. Kate Carstairs: the mother of the family, her original concern was that she find a house with a kitchen large enough to eat in, a fireplace in the living room, and a separate dining room. She discovered the first broken mirror with an X after her compact fell out of her purse. A practical woman, she doesn't want to think about the happenings in and around her household, but she can't stop herself.
- Mrs. David Aylwood (Anne Sinclair): the unwilling seller of the house, she has the ability to "see" the Watcher. A widow, her daughter Karen disappeared fifty years before the Carstairs family moved in. Mrs. Aylwood taught the concept of the alphabet and words to the Watcher soon after she appeared because she believed the Watcher "came from Karen". She moves into a nearby convalescent home after selling her house to the Carstairs. At the end of the story, she goes to the Watcher's world.
- Karen Aylwood: a fifteen-year-old who vanished without a trace one morning. A bright and popular young lady, she was known to love the pond in the woods on her family's property. At the end of the book she's still in the Watcher's world. It is believed she and her mother were reunited there. She did not haunt the children, the Watcher forced her to make the children hear and do things.
- Mike Fleming: the nineteen-year-old neighbor boy who is hired to redo the kitchen floor. Mike gives Ellie the puppy which she christens "Nerak", which is Karen spelled backward. He provides a sounding board for Jan when she tries to solve the mystery of the Watcher. He brings Mrs. Aylwood back to her former home and prepares a wheelchair to carry her into the woods.
- Mr. and Mrs. Fleming: Mike's parents and the Carstairs' nearest neighbors. They have a farm with chickens. Mrs. Fleming tells Jan the story of Karen's disappearance, as she heard it from her mother-in-law.
- Mrs. Thayer: the real estate agent, she is aware that there is something unusual about the Aylwood place but she tries to dismiss the stories as local gossip.
- Wilbur Middleton: a local carpenter, he is convinced that a dryad inhabits the woods. (Mentioned by name only)
- The Watcher: a female alien humanoid-child. She was described to have a pointy chin, an upturned nose and wore a long flowing robe. Fifty years before, her parents had taken her to a ceremonial coming-of-age ritual on their home planet in which she was to view earth, but Karen, during her walk, was too near the portal when it opened and the two changed places. She is here as an observer and communicates with her race through telepathy. She is able to communicate with Ellie because they are both children. Fifty years on our planet equals only a day on hers. Her attempts at communication are meant to convey that the door between both worlds will soon be open. The Watcher opts to stay until the next opening of the portal in order for Mrs. Aylwood to use this "going-forth" to reunite with Karen in the alien's home world.

== Release ==
A Watcher in the Woods received its first edition printing by Atheneum Books in March 1976. The book was reprinted under the title The Watcher in the Woods in 1980 as a tie-in with the film version by Scholastic Books.

=== Reception ===
Kirkus Reviews gave the book a negative review, criticizing the protagonist of the novel, and saying: "The watcher has something to do with time warps and immortality and, ultimately of course, God, but Jan's responses are so sophomorically wooden that one longs for the comparatively forthcoming poltergeist of The Almost Year (1971). A step backwards. . . into the void."

Jane Resh Thomas, writing in The New York Times said, "Her novel's conclusion seems abrupt and incomplete, as if she wrote herself into a corner and escaped by main force."

== Film adaptations ==
The novel was adapted to film in 1980 by Walt Disney Pictures with Bette Davis as Mrs. Aylwood. The Watcher in the Woods is now considered by many to be a cult classic, and is further known for the rewritings, re-shootings, and re-editings of the film's conclusion after it was pulled from theatres, as well as the removal of the original opening credits, which were replaced by new scenes filmed by a different, uncredited director.

Melissa Joan Hart directed a television film remake with Anjelica Huston as Mrs. Aylwood. It premiered on Lifetime on October 21, 2017.
