= Florence Engel Randall =

American novelist

- Born: October 18, 1917; Brooklyn, New York City, U.S.
- Died: September 4, 1997 (aged 79); Great Neck, New York, U.S.
- Education: New York University
- Occupations: Novelist, writer
- Spouse: Murray Charles Randall
- Writing career
- Genres: Children's fiction, Gothic literature, Women's fiction, Supernatural fiction, Ghost story, Weird fiction, Science fiction, Horror fiction
- Notable works: The Watchers (1965); The Almost Year (1971); A Watcher in the Woods (1976)

Florence Engel Randall (October 18, 1917 – September 4, 1997) was an American author. Over the course of her career, Randall authored five novels and penned more than one hundred short stories. She is most notably recognized for her novel A Watcher in the Woods (1976), a work that inspired a 1980 Disney film adaptation and a 2017 remake for Lifetime Television.

== Personal life ==
Randall was born on October 17, 1917, in Brooklyn, New York City. She was born to Stewart Engel, a prominent attorney, and his wife Rachel Seligman Engel.

Randall's educational journey led her to New York University, where she pursued her studies in the late 1930s. She once confessed that she had always harbored a desire to be a writer but initially pursued other creative outlets, including art and music. Although she had one short story published when she was 18, it wasn't until decades later when Randall's career really began. On November 5, 1939, she married Murray Charles Randall, a sales executive, and together they had three children: Susan, Laurel, and Stewart. Her writing journey began in earnest when her brother gifted her a battered typewriter while her third child was still a toddler. Her basement, adjacent to the washer, became her creative haven, where she diligently crafted stories amidst household duties.

Randall died in 1997 in Great Neck, New York, where she lived in her later life. Her papers are preserved in a collection at the Gotlieb Archival Research Center at Boston University. There is also a scholarship for women writers granted annually from the university, named The Randall Award.

== Works ==
In the early 1960s, Florence Engel Randall embarked on a prolific journey of crafting short stories that found their home in the pages of prominent women's magazines. Her regular contributions to Redbook featured signature two-page shorts.

Within these early stories, Randall displayed her adeptness at exploring the intricacies of family life. She navigated the multifaceted relationships between generations, emphasizing the profound emotional connections that bound them together. Her narratives captured the challenges and joys of motherhood, while also delving into the nuanced dynamics of human relationships, from the purity of youthful romance to the intricate complexities of marriage. Randall's literary talent extended to the examination of self-identity, prompting readers to contemplate the evolution of individuals over time and the notion of one's identity mirroring that of their parents.

While these short stories enjoyed immense popularity among readers of the era, it was Randall's ventures into the realms of science fiction, fantasy, and horror that left a more lasting imprint. She contributed two stories to Fantastic Stories of Imagination that foreshadowed future works. "One Long Ribbon" presented a tale where a young widow inherits a house from her late husband, with a sudden twist into The Twilight Zone when she discovers her invisibility to neighbors, and her son's inability to see the anyone living around them. Her subsequent tale, "The Boundary Beyond" centered on a mysterious, man-stealing dryad emerging from the depths of the woods.

However, it was her groundbreaking 1965 short story for Harper's Magazine, "The Watchers," that truly shifted her career. Set in a dystopian society where violence and murder became a form of entertainment, this narrative explored the chilling concept of selected individuals performing violent acts on a stage while society watched in ominous silence. "The Watchers" gained widespread recognition and found its way into multiple anthologies. Additionally, it was adapted as a teleplay for the 1985 reboot of The Twilight Zone, although it was ultimately never produced.

By the late 1960s, Randall finally pursued her longtime dream of becoming a novelist. Her first book, Hedgerow, is a gothic romance centering on a young dancer who takes a summer babysitting job. She becomes intrigued by the suicide of the young girl's mother and starts digging up family secrets, falling for both the girl's father and uncle in the process.

Her next novel, “The Place of Sapphires,” was expanded from a novella that was first published in a 1968 issue of Cosmopolitan magazine. Randall diligently researched occult phenomenon, unexpectedly befriending a librarian who held supernatural beliefs in the process. The story centers on two sisters who move into a Cape Cod home following a tragic accident that claimed their parents. The injured girl bunks in a room previously occupied by Alarice, a ghost with unfinished business who takes possession of her body. The story is told from the points of view of both sisters and the ghost.

In 1971, she authored her first book for young adults, “The Almost Year.” Expanding on the research for her previous novel, and inspired by desegregation busing in her neighborhood, Randall spent two years working on the book. It tells the story of young black girl from the ghetto who fancies herself a witch and is forced to spend nine months living with a wealthy white family. Tensions within the house rise, and eventually, all of the inhabitants are forced to contend with a poltergeist. The book was highly lauded, earning recognition as an American Library Association Notable Book upon its release.

Her 1973 novel “Haldane Station” took readers on a warped journey as a teenage girl investigating the disappearance of her aunt finds herself traveling through time and alternate dimensions in an attempt to learn the truth.

But it was her 1976 book, "A Watcher in the Woods," that had the most lasting impact, notably through its 1980 Disney film adaptation starring Bette Davis. The story, centered on a family moving into a new house with eerie occurrences, explored the themes of youth, aging, and the unknown. Both feature an otherworldly antagonist, but the Disney adaptation gradually deviates from the source material, and the 2017 remake is an even more drastic departure.

Randall's output slowed after the Disney film's release, with her final novel, "All the Sky Together," released in 1985, focusing on a young adult who traps herself in a tragic love triangle.

== Novels ==
- Hedgerow (1967)
- The Place of Sapphires (1969)
- The Almost Year (1971)
- Haldane Station (1973)
- A Watcher in the Woods (1976)
- All the Sky Together (1985)

== Short stories ==
The following list is incomplete.

Title	Originally published in	Notes
"Honey in the Tea"	Chatelaine, January 1962	
"One Long Ribbon"	Fantastic Stories of Imagination, July 1962	
"Thursday, We Kiss"	Seventeen, August 1962	Adapted by Frances T. Humphreville and Charlotte B. Diamant in their 1965 book "On the Threshold"
"Heirloom "	Redbook, February 1963	
"Close By My Side"	Good Housekeeping, April 1963	
"A Meeting Place"	Redbook, May 1963	
"The Party"	Chatelaine, May 1963	
"Night Life"	Redbook, August 1963	
"Newcomer"	Redbook, September 1963	
"Please Call the Office "	Redbook, December 1963	
"No Beginning, No End"	Redbook, March 1964	
"The Pumpkin Eater"	Chatelaine, April 1964	
"Where Did It Go? "	Redbook, April 1964	
"The Boundary Beyond"	Fantastic Stories of Imagination, July 1964	
"Friendship"	Redbook, September 1964	
"No One Kicks Cans Anymore"	Redbook, April 1965	
"The Watchers"	Harper's July 1965	Reprinted in numerous anthologies.
"The Early Hours"	The Australian Women's Weekly, February 1966	
"First Chill"	Redbook, October 1967	
"The Place of Sapphires"	Cosmopolitan, November 1968	Expanded and republished the next year as a novel.
"Happy Birthday to You"	Ladies Home Journal, April 1969	
"The Cat"	Virginia Quarterly Review, Summer 1970	
"The Day We Lose Each Other"	Woman's Day, June 1974	
"Climate of a Marriage"	Woman's Day, September 1976	
"The Coming of Cynthia "	Woman's Day, April 1977	

== Bibliography ==
- Radcliffe, Elsa J. (1979). Gothic Novels of the Twentieth Century: An Annotated Bibliography. London: The Scarecrow Press. ISBN 9780810811904.
