= Harold and the Purple Crayon (film) =

2024 American film by Carlos Saldanha

- Theatrical release poster
- Directed by: Carlos Saldanha
- Screenplay by: David Guion; Michael Handelman
- Based on: Harold and the Purple Crayon by Crockett Johnson
- Produced by: John Davis
- Starring: Zachary Levi; Lil Rel Howery; Benjamin Bottani; Jemaine Clement; Tanya Reynolds; Alfred Molina; Zooey Deschanel
- Cinematography: Gabriel Beristain
- Edited by: Tia Nolan; Mark Helfrich
- Music by: Batu Sener
- Production companies: Columbia Pictures; Davis Entertainment
- Distributed by: Sony Pictures Releasing
- Release dates: July 21, 2024 (Culver City); August 2, 2024 (United States)
- Running time: 105 minutes
- Country: United States
- Language: English
- Budget: $40 million
- Box office: $32.2 million

Harold and the Purple Crayon is a 2024 American live-action animated fantasy comedy film directed by Carlos Saldanha in his live-action directorial debut, from a screenplay by David Guion and Michael Handelman, based on the 1955 children's book by Crockett Johnson. Combining live-action and animation, the film stars Zachary Levi, Lil Rel Howery, Benjamin Bottani, Jemaine Clement, Tanya Reynolds, Alfred Molina, and Zooey Deschanel. In the film, after he draws himself off the book's pages and into the physical world, Harold finds that he has a lot to learn about real life.

Produced by John Davis through Davis Entertainment, the film premiered at Culver City in Los Angeles on July 21, 2024, and was released in the United States by Sony Pictures Releasing through its Columbia Pictures label on August 2. The film received generally negative reviews from critics and was a box-office bomb, grossing $32.2 million against a $40 million production budget. It received a Golden Raspberry Award nomination, Worst Actor for Levi.

== Plot ==
A young boy named Harold lives inside a book. His magic purple crayon can make anything come to life, including his friends Moose and Porcupine, whom he spends time with.

Now grown up, Harold continues to have adventures. One day, the narrator, whom Harold refers to as "old man", mysteriously disappears. Determined to find him, Harold draws a door to real life, then passes through it with Moose. In the city of Providence, Rhode Island, Harold and a now human Moose look for the old man, whom Harold believes is his father. Terry, the struggling single mother of an imaginative boy named Mel, accidentally hits Harold and Moose with her car. Mel convinces Terry to let Harold and Moose stay for a night. He then secretly invites Harold downstairs and the two bond. Harold breaks off part of his crayon and gives it to Mel.

The next day, Terry tells Harold and Moose to leave. Upon leaving, Mel secretly joins them to look for Harold's father. In a library, they meet Gary Natwick, a librarian who struggles to pitch his idea for a fantasy novel. The three ask Gary if he can locate Harold's father via a computer, but this yields no results and the three leave. Harold draws a plane and uses contrails to display Terry's phone number in the sky, asking their "old man" to call the number. Gary sees Harold draw the plane and recognizes the book he came from.

Gary meets up with Harold and Moose and shows them the book they came from. Harold sees the author's name on the cover and realizes that the "old man" he was searching for is named Crockett Johnson. Harold and Moose later reunite with Porcupine, who is tackled by cops due to having previously broken into a house. They are arrested, but quickly escape. They arrive at Johnson's house, only to find that he has died. Harold is distraught, causing all of his drawings to fade away, including Moose and Porcupine.

Alone, Harold meets up with Gary, who convinces Harold to give him the crayon, which Gary uses to imprison Harold and cosplay himself as a warrior from his fantasy novel. Mel arrives to rescue Harold; he is imprisoned too, but frees himself and Harold using the crayon piece Harold gave him, restoring everything Harold drew. In the town square they encounter Gary, who uses the crayon to summon his fantasy world. Harold and Gary fight for the whole crayon, until Gary swallows Harold's piece and absorbs its power, transforming the grass into molten lava. Mel uses his imaginary creature and a spider-fly hybrid to make Gary spit out the crayon. After everything returns to normal, Harold draws Gary a door to the fantasy world from his novel. Gary enters the door, which is subsequently burnt down by the creature, trapping him permanently.

Harold, Moose, Porcupine, Terry and Mel visit a museum of Crockett Johnson's work. After Harold discovers why he was created in a note left by Johnson, he, Moose and Porcupine return to their world, with Mel handing Harold a pack of Crayola crayons when saying goodbye. Harold is overjoyed to have more colors and immediately begins experimenting.

== Cast ==
- Zachary Levi as Harold, a man who, since his childhood, has a magical purple crayon which makes whatever he draws come to life
- Lil Rel Howery as Moose, one of Harold's friends who becomes human in the real world and occasionally turns into a real moose
- Benjamin Bottani as Mel, a boy who befriends Harold
- Jemaine Clement as Gary, a librarian who uses a piece of Harold's crayon to bring his fantasy novel to life
- Tanya Reynolds as Porcupine, one of Harold's friends who becomes human in the real world
- Alfred Molina as Narrator, who talks directly with animated Harold and his friends as Harold's "Old Man" (Crockett Johnson)
- Zooey Deschanel as Terry, Mel's widowed mother
- Pete Gardner as Detective Love
- Camille Guaty as Junior Detective Silva
- Ravi Patel as Prasad, Terry's manager at work
- Grace Junot as Yasmin, the publishing house editor who rejects Gary’s manuscript.

== Production ==
=== Development ===
In 1992, John B. Carls formed the family-film production company, Wild Things Productions, with Maurice Sendak, writer and illustrator of Where the Wild Things Are. They acquired rights to other children's books, including Harold and the Purple Crayon, whose author, Crockett Johnson, was a mentor to Sendak. Sendak and Denise Di Novi were producers. In 1994, Michael Tolkin was brought in to write the script and Henry Selick was attached to direct, but Selick moved on to James and the Giant Peach for Walt Disney Pictures. Carls picked Spike Jonze to develop the film, a combination of live action and animation. David O. Russell was brought in to help with rewrites. Multiple screenplays, casting, storyboards, and animation work started, but Jonze had to abandon the project after more than a year of working on it when new management at TriStar Pictures stopped it, two months before principal photography was to begin.

In February 2010, it was reported that Columbia Pictures, Sony Pictures Animation, Steven Spielberg's Amblin Entertainment, and Will Smith's Overbrook Entertainment were developing an animated film adaptation of Harold and the Purple Crayon, to be produced by Smith and James Lassiter and written by Josh Klausner. In December 2016, it was reported that the film would also be written by Dallas Clayton.

=== Resurgence ===
On February 1, 2021, it was reported that Zachary Levi would star in the film, though it was initially not stated what role he would play at that time, except that the film would now be a combination of live-action and animation. It was also announced that Carlos Saldanha was attached to direct the new film and that David Guion and Michael Handelman replaced Klausner and Clayton as screenwriters, with John Davis producing through his Davis Entertainment banner. Lil Rel Howery was announced as part of the cast on January 11, 2022. Zooey Deschanel and Ravi Patel were added in February 2022. Camille Guaty was cast on March 1, 2022. Tanya Reynolds and Pete Gardner joined in May 2022. In January 2024, it was revealed that Jemaine Clement had joined the cast, reuniting with Saldanha after having previously voiced Nigel in Rio (2011) and its sequel, Rio 2 (2014), both of which Saldanha directed while working for Blue Sky, while Alfred Molina was revealed to be the narrator.

Around the beginning of 2022, live-action filming took place in Atlanta, Georgia. Gabriel Beristain served as the cinematographer.

=== Post-production ===
Tia Nolan and Mark Helfrich serve as editors for the film.

=== Visual effects ===
The visual effects were provided by Rising Sun Pictures, Folks VFX, Framestore, Soho VFX, Opsis, Clear Angle Studio, Spin VFX, Nexodus and Mammal Studios, while the 2D animated sequences were provided by Bent Image Lab. The end credits animation was provided by Plucky.

== Music ==
In February 2023, Batu Sener, who previously provided additional music to films composed by Saldanha's frequent collaborator John Powell, was announced to be composing the film's score. The full score was released on August 2, 2024, alongside an original single titled "Colors", performed by Boots Ottestad and Jordy Searcy, which plays during the film's closing credits.

== Release ==
Harold and the Purple Crayon was released in theaters on August 2, 2024. It was originally scheduled to be released on January 27, 2023, and June 30, 2023.

=== Home media ===
Sony Pictures Home Entertainment released the film on digital download on August 27, and on Blu-ray and DVD on October 8.

In April 2021, Sony signed deals with Netflix and Disney for the rights to their 2022 to 2026 film slate, following the films' theatrical and home media windows. Netflix signed for exclusive "pay 1 window" streaming rights, which is typically an 18-month window and included Harold and the Purple Crayon. Disney signed for "pay 2 window" rights for the films, which would be streamed on Disney+ and Hulu as well as broadcast on Disney's linear television networks.

The Netflix move would prove somewhat ironic in this film's case, as several news outlets, most notably Bloomberg News, reported in October 2024 that Sony had attempted to sell the film directly to the streamer, in a manner similar to such reports for Sony's Holmes & Watson when they had previously attempted to do so in 2018; it was reported that the offer was made out of concerns from Sony that the film would have their intended family audience usurped by rival releases Inside Out 2 and Despicable Me 4. Much like the Holmes attempt, Netflix refused, choosing to focus more on in-house projects and their distribution window deals at that time.

=== Marketing ===
The first teaser posters were released on March 13, 2024, confirming that Harold would be played by Levi and that the character, originally a child, would be portrayed as a grown man in the film. A trailer for the film was released on March 20, 2024. On June 25, 2024, Crayola partnered with Sony Pictures UK for a competition to find specially wrapped purple crayons hidden in packs of the 24-count crayons. The winner would be flown off on a family vacation to New York City and taken to the Crayola Experience as part of their prize.

== Reception ==
=== Box office ===
As of October 3, 2024, Harold and the Purple Crayon has grossed $17.6 million in the United States and Canada, and $14.6 million in other territories, for a worldwide total of $32.2 million. This ultimately meant the film failed to recover its reported $40 million budget, becoming a box office bomb. Deadline Hollywood writer Anthony D'Alessandro suggested the reasons for the film's failure, besides its competitors and poor reviews, was the intellectual property in general being too old for most moviegoers, as well as too juvenile for most non-family audiences, leaving the film with a very small target audience; he further suggested it was also because the "low budget, zany-fantastical formula of old kids IP" that Sony Pictures had previously done with Peter Rabbit and Lyle, Lyle, Crocodile, in his opinion, was considered "old hat" by audiences by that time.

In the United States and Canada, Harold and the Purple Crayon was released alongside Trap, and was projected to gross $5–6 million from 3,325 theaters in its opening weekend. Its release date caused the film to face competition with Deadpool & Wolverine and Trap, the latter which was released the same day, as well as the aforementioned competition with Inside Out 2 and Despicable Me 4, which were released earlier in the summer. The film made $2.4 million on its first day, going on to debut to $6 million, finishing sixth at the box office.

=== Critical response ===
On the review aggregator website Rotten Tomatoes, 28% of 72 critics' reviews are positive, with an average rating of 4.3/10. The website's consensus reads: "A high-concept treatment that misses out on the blissful simplicity of its source material, Harold and the Purple Crayon is a tribute to imagination that's content to only color inside the lines." Metacritic, which uses a weighted average, assigned the film a score of 34 out of 100, based on 23 critics, indicating "generally unfavorable" reviews. Audiences polled by CinemaScore gave the film an average grade of "A–" on an A+ to F scale, while those surveyed by PostTrak gave it an overall positive score of 70%, with 46% saying they would definitely recommend the film.

=== Accolades ===
Year	Award / Film Festival	Category	Recipient(s)	Result	Ref.
2024	Family Film Awards	Outstanding Actor in a Feature Film	Zachary Levi	Nominated	
2025	Golden Raspberry Awards	Worst Actor	Zachary Levi	Nominated	
