= Delicious (TV series) =

British television series

- Genre: Drama
- Created by: Dan Sefton
- Written by: Dan Sefton
- Directed by: Clare Kilner; John Hardwick
- Starring: Dawn French; Emilia Fox; Tanya Reynolds; Ruairi O'Connor; Iain Glen; Sheila Hancock; Risteárd Cooper; Franco Nero; Aaron Anthony; Vincent Regan; Rhashan Stone
- Country of origin: United Kingdom
- Original language: English
- No. of series: 3
- No. of episodes: 12

Production
- Executive producers: Phillippa Giles; Anna Ferguson
- Producer: Phillippa Giles
- Production locations: Cornwall, England
- Running time: 45 mins.
- Production company: Bandit Television

Original release
- Network: Sky One
- Release: 30 December 2016 – 18 January 2019

Delicious is a British drama television series starring Dawn French and Emilia Fox. The first four-part series, written by Dan Sefton and directed by Clare Kilner and John Hardwick, premiered on Sky One on 30 December 2016. A second season followed, and the third and final season ended on 18 January 2019.

== Synopsis ==
The series is set in Cornwall, England, where celebrity chef Leo is married to the beautiful Sam and has a successful hotel business. However, he is having an affair with his first wife Gina, a talented cook from whom he stole many of his recipes and cheated on for years.

Leo has a grown daughter Teresa with Gina and a grown son Michael with Sam. Leo's mother Mimi is alive, and lives at the hotel. At the end of the first episode, Leo dies, but he does not disappear. He comes back in memories or in conversations with Gina, or as a voice commenting on the dilemmas faced by those he loved. The restaurant is left to Gina, while the money is left to Sam. There is not much money, so Sam and Gina decide to run the hotel together. Teresa's real father James shows up, Gina's ex; Michael and Teresa learn they are not half siblings. One year after Leo dies, another grown son, Adam, a chef, appears on the scene, product of an affair Leo had with a supplier and whom Gina has taken on as her protégé. Further, Gina's father appears at the hotel.

Gina marries James, Teresa's father, in a huge wedding and reception at the hotel. En route to their honeymoon, Gina tells him she cannot be married and walks out. Michael and Teresa go off travelling together; Teresa returns home alone at the start of Series 3. Mimi gives Teresa a pregnancy test kit. Teresa is pregnant. Mimi has had a biopsy of a lump but has not looked at the results of the biopsy. Mimi and Teresa make a pact to keep each other's secrets. Meanwhile, Gina and Sam separately sleep with the same man, Mason Elliot, who loves Gina's cooking and is sought by Gina as an investor in the hotel. Teresa begins working in the hotel, with a focus on keeping the cost of supplies in line.

== Cast and characters ==
=== Overview ===
Actor	Character	Series 1	Series 2	Series 3
Main characters
Dawn French	Gina Benelli	All episodes	All episodes	All episodes
Emilia Fox	Sam Vincent	All episodes	All episodes	All episodes
Tanya Reynolds	Teresa Benelli	All episodes	All episodes	All episodes
Ruairí O'Connor	Michael Vincent	All episodes	Episodes 2–4	
Iain Glen	Leo Vincent	All episodes	All episodes	All episodes
Sheila Hancock	Mimi Vincent	All episodes	All episodes	All episodes
Risteárd Cooper	James Harley	Episodes 3–4	All episodes	
Franco Nero	Joe Benelli		All episodes	
Aaron Anthony	Adam Hesketh		All episodes	All episodes
Rhashan Stone	Marc Wilson		Episode 2	Episodes 2–4
Vincent Regan	Mason Elliot			All episodes
Supporting characters
Vinette Robinson	Rosa	Episodes 1–3		
Kemi-Bo Jacobs	Suzy	Episodes 1–3	All episodes	
Mark Letheren	Dio Tremayne	Episodes 2–4	Episodes 2–4	All episodes
Pandora Colin	DI Marilyn Hicks	Episode 3	Episodes 1, 3	
Aidan McArdle	DI Jonathan Jones		Episodes 1–2	
Cassie Clare	Rhiannon			All episodes
Claudia Harrison	Dr. Janice Woods			Episodes 2–4

=== Main characters ===
- Dawn French as Gina Benelli, Leo's first wife and mentor, later owner of the Penrose Hotel and chef at its restaurant
- Emilia Fox as Sam Vincent, Leo's widow, eventually manager and co-owner of the Penrose
- Iain Glen as Leo Vincent, a celebrity chef and owner of the Penrose, prior to his death
- Tanya Reynolds as Teresa Benelli, Leo and Gina's daughter, eventually Sam's assistant manager
- Ruairí O'Connor as Michael Vincent, Leo and Sam's son (series 1–2)
- Sheila Hancock as Mimi Vincent, Leo's mother, eventually the Penrose's concierge following Suzy's resignation
- Risteárd Cooper as James Harley, Gina's ex-boyfriend and Teresa's biological father (series 1–2)
- Aaron Anthony as Adam Hesketh, Gina's sous-chef and Leo's biological son (series 2–3)
- Franco Nero as Giuseppe "Joe" Benelli, Gina's estranged father (series 2)
- Rhashan Stone as Marc Wilson, Sam's high school boyfriend (series 2–3)
- Vincent Regan as Mason Elliot, a wealthy restaurateur and investor who becomes a rival chef to Gina (series 3)

=== Supporting characters ===
- Vinette Robinson as Rosa, the town doctor (series 1)
- Kemi-Bo Jacobs as Suzy, the Penrose's concierge (series 1–2)
- Mark Letheren as Dio Tremayne, Michael's friend, later an employee at the Penrose (series 1–3)
- Pandora Colin as DI Marilyn Hicks, who investigates Leo and later Sam and Gina for fraud (series 1–2)
- Aidan McArdle as DI Jonathan Jones, Hicks' detective partner (series 2)
- Cassie Clare as Rhiannon, a chef and waitress in Mason's restaurant (series 3)
- Claudia Harrison as Dr. Janice Woods, Mimi's doctor (series 3)

== Episodes ==
Series	Episodes	Originally released	
Series	Episodes	First released	Last released
1	4	30 December 2016	20 January 2017
2	4	29 December 2017	19 January 2018
3	4	28 December 2018	18 January 2019

=== Series 1 (2016–2017) ===
No. overall	No. in series	Title	Directed by	Written by	Original release date	UK viewers (millions)
1	1	"Death Comes to All"	Clare Kilner	Dan Sefton	30 December 2016	1.22
2	2	"Funeral Plans"	Clare Kilner	Dan Sefton	6 January 2017	1.81
3	3	"Penrose"	John Hardwick	Dan Sefton	13 January 2017	2.00
4	4	"The Visitor"	John Hardwick	Dan Sefton	20 January 2017	1.79

=== Series 2 (2017–2018) ===
No. overall	No. in series	Title	Directed by	Written by	Original release date	UK viewers (millions)
5	1	"Secrets of the Father"	Clare Kilner	Dan Sefton	29 December 2017	N/A
6	2	"Ghost"	Clare Kilner	Lee Coan, Dan Sefton	5 January 2018	N/A
7	3	"One Year Later"	John Hardwick	Ursula Rani Sarma, Dan Sefton	12 January 2018	N/A
8	4	"Our Brother"	John Hardwick	Dan Sefton	19 January 2018	N/A

=== Series 3 (2018–2019) ===
No. overall	No. in series	Title	Directed by	Written by	Original release date	UK viewers (millions)
9	1	"The Heart"	Robin Sheppard	Ursula Rani Sarma	28 December 2018	N/A
10	2	"Betrayed"	Robin Sheppard	Lee Coan	4 January 2019	N/A
11	3	"Not Intimidated"	Amit Gupta	Melissa Bubnic	11 January 2019	N/A
12	4	"Do What Feels Right"	Amit Gupta	Ursula Rani Sarma	18 January 2019	N/A

== Production ==
Delicious was written by Dan Sefton and directed by Clare Kilner and John Hardwick.

The series is predominantly filmed in South East Cornwall, with Pentillie Castle featuring as Leo's Penrose Hotel.

While many of the exterior shots are filmed at Pentillie Castle, the interiors can be found at a number of other country houses, including Port Eliot and Boconnoc. Interiors scenes in Mason's restaurant were filmed in the River Cottage Kitchen (now closed) at the Royal William Yard in Plymouth. Some scenes were filmed in Calstock on the river Tamar, and include scenes in and around Lishe, a local tea room.

== Broadcast ==
The four-part first series premiered on Sky 1 on 30 December 2016. finishing in January 2017. Sky renewed the show for a second series in February 2017. The second series aired on Sky 1 from Friday, 29 December 2017. On 13 February 2018, it was announced that Delicious had been renewed for a third season.

In June 2019, Dawn French confirmed that the show would not be coming back for a fourth season.

In Australia, Delicious premiered on ABC Television in May 2017. In Sweden on SVT1 in January 2018 and in the Netherlands on NPO 1 in July 2018 . In Finland Yle1 in September 2019.

== Reception ==
=== Critical response ===
The series has garnered mixed reviews. The Sydney Morning Herald's Bridget McManus gave the first episode four stars out of four and praised French's performance. The Radio Times' Ben Dowell commented positively on the series, saying it has "offered a visual feast but it’s the sure-footed storytelling and strong central performances that has got me hooked."

On the other hand, The Daily Telegraph's Ed Power gave the first episode two stars out of five, saying: "The awkward blend of soapy escapism and dark comedy left a funny taste, with mismatched performances adding to the queasiness."

=== Ratings ===
The first season of Delicious had an average audience of 1.87 million, making it the most watched Sky 1 original drama in 2016.

== Home media ==
Series	Release date (individual sets)			
Series	Region 1 (U.S.)	Region A (U.S.)	Region 2 (UK)	Region 4 (AU)
1	29 August 2017	22 November 2019	30 January 2017	5 July 2017
2	3 July 2018	22 November 2019	5 February 2018	7 March 2018
3	4 June 2019	22 November 2019	28 January 2019	17 April 2019
Series	Release date (multiple sets)			
Series	Region 2 (UK)		Region 4 (AU)	
1–2	5 February 2018		7 March 2018	
1–3	28 January 2019		TBA	
