= I Hate You (TV series) =

British television series

- Genre: Sitcom
- Created by: Robert Popper
- Written by: Robert Popper
- Directed by: Damon Beesley
- Starring: Tanya Reynolds; Melissa Saint
- Country of origin: United Kingdom
- Original language: English
- No. of series: 1
- No. of episodes: 6

Production
- Executive producers: Caroline Leddy; Kenton Allen; Matthew Justice
- Producer: Robert Popper
- Production companies: Popper Pictures; Big Talk Productions

Original release
- Network: Channel 4
- Release: 13 October – 17 November 2022

I Hate You is a six-part 2022 British comedy television series created by Robert Popper. It was available on streaming service All4 in September 2022 and ran for one series on Channel 4 in October 2022.

== Synopsis ==
Two 20-something women, Charlie and Becca, flatmates and best friends, endure a love-hate relationship.

== Cast ==
- Tanya Reynolds as Charlie
- Melissa Saint as Becca
- Shaquille Ali-Yebuah as Karl
- Maddie Rice as Miriam
- Chetna Pandya as Mrs Plant
- Harry Trevaldwyn as Matthew
- Jonny Sweet as Bob
- Joe Tracini as Ryan
- Levi Brown as Two Time
- James Bradwell as Bradley

== Production ==
The series was created by British comedy writer and producer Robert Popper. Popper devised the concept five years prior to broadcast, as about two best friends but in a series entitled I Hate You and told The Evening Standard that he wanted to explore how a relationship with a best friend "is a super intense thing and you sometimes say, 'I...hate them so much,' even though you love them". The series cast is led by Tanya Reynolds and Melissa Saint, playing the best friends. Saint auditioned for the show in March 2021, with Reynolds cast at the end of 2020. The cast also included Shaquille Ali-Yebuah, Chetna Pandya, Joe Tracini and Jonny Sweet. The series also features a cameo voice-appearance from Peter Serafinowicz as a talking horse.

== Broadcast ==
The six-part series was released at the end of September 2022 on the Channel 4 streaming service All 4, it was part of a trial that saw the whole series debut online a fortnight before the first episode aired on television on 13 October 2022.

== Reception ==
Rebecca Nicholson in The Guardian gave the series two stars and described it as "watching two grown women possessed by the spirit of puerile teenage boys." Michael Hogan in The Daily Telegraph labelled the series as "misfiring" and said "Calling a TV series I Hate You is asking for trouble. Especially when that series is so easy to dislike." Steve Bennett for Chortle compared the series to Popper's earlier sitcom Friday Night Dinner, saying that the characters Charlie and Becca are "vessels for the same kind of dumb jokes and piss-taking that defined the sibling relationship between Adam and Jonny" in that show, and concluded that "the off-the-wall tone's probably close enough to appeal to fans of its illustrious predecessor."
