= Girl Taken =

British television series

- Genre: Thriller
- Based on: Baby Doll by Hollie Overton
- Developed by: David Turpin
- Written by: David Turpin; Suzanne Cowie; Nessa Muthy
- Directed by: Laura Way; Bindu de Stoppani
- Starring: Jill Halfpenny; Alfie Allen; Tallulah Evans; Delphi Evans; Vikash Bhai; Victoria Ekanoye; Niamh Walsh; Levi Brown
- Country of origin: United Kingdom
- Original language: English
- No. of series: 1
- No. of episodes: 6

Production
- Executive producers: Mike Benson; Suzi McIntosh; Pul Testar; Sebastian Cardwell; Hollie Overton
- Producer: Mick Pantaleo
- Production company: Clapperboard Studios

Original release
- Network: Paramount+
- Release: 8 January 2026

Girl Taken is a six-part British psychological thriller television series developed by David Turpin and based on Hollie Overton's 2016 novel Baby Doll. Produced by Clapperboard Studios for Paramount+, it stars Tallulah Evans and Delphi Evans as twin sisters Lily and Abby Riser, alongside Alfie Allen, Jill Halfpenny, Niamh Walsh, and Levi Brown. The series follows the Riser family after Lily is abducted by her teacher, Rick Hansen, and held captive for five years.

== Premise ==
Seventeen-year-old sisters Lily and Abby Riser live with their mother, Eve, in a rural English town. After Lily accepts a ride from their trusted teacher, Rick Hansen, he abducts her and holds her captive in an isolated cottage. Five years later, Lily escapes and returns home, where she must adjust to the changes that occurred during her absence. Her return forces the family to confront the lasting effects of her captivity while investigators attempt to bring Rick to justice.

== Cast ==
=== Main ===
- Jill Halfpenny as Eve Riser, Lily and Abby's mother
- Alfie Allen as Rick Hansen
- Tallulah Evans as Lily Riser, Eve's daughter and Abby's twin sister
- Delphi Evans as Abby Riser, Eve's daughter and Lily's twin sister
- Vikash Bhai as Tommy
- Niamh Walsh as Zoe Hansen
- Levi Brown as Wes, Lily's boyfriend
- Victoria Ekanoye as Rachel Brenton

=== Supporting ===
- Holly Atkins as Melanie
- Kiran Krishnakumar as Archie

== Episodes ==
No.	Title	Directed by	Written by	Original release date
1	"Snatched"	Laura Way	David Turpin	8 January 2026
17-year-old twins Lily and Abby Riser attend their final day of secondary school. Abby shares her University of Stirling acceptance letter with her English teacher, Rick Hansen, but hides it from Lily and their mother, Eve. Lily attends a party in an abandoned warehouse while Rick covertly stalks Abby from his car. Abby confronts Lily at the party and they argue over Abby's dishonesty and Lily's irresponsibility. Lily runs away after Abby says she hates her. Walking home, Lily accepts a ride from Rick, who renders her unconscious with a chloroform rag. Abby arrives home, but she and Eve do not report Lily missing until the next morning. Lily's mobile is found on the side of the road, but no information about her whereabouts is discovered. Rick participates in search efforts and consoles Abby, all while hiding Lily from his wife, Zoe. Abby has a tense encounter with Lily's boyfriend, Wes, who has been cleared of suspicion in her disappearance. Afterwards, Abby accepts a ride from Rick, who begins driving the same route he took Lily, but ultimately drops off Abby at her house. Rick visits Lily, whom he has chained up in an isolated cottage basement. He strikes her when she says she wants to go home and forces her to don a slip dress.
2	"Trapped"	Laura Way	David Turpin	8 January 2026
By Lily and Abby's eighteenth birthday, nearly a year after Lily's abduction, she is pregnant by Rick, who forces her to role-play as his loving wife. Abby has skipped university while Eve has begun an affair with Tommy Shah, a detective on Lily's case. Zoe spontaneously visits Rick's cottage, where he regularly retreats on the pretence of writing a novel, and skims his manuscript, entitled "Baby Doll", which is Rick's nickname for Lily. Rick diverts her away. At a party, Archie, Lily's former friend, insults her in front of Abby, who retaliates by setting his car on fire. Archie attacks Abby, but Wes defends her. Abby and Wes bond, and the latter expresses his feeling that Lily is still alive. Eve encourages Abby to attend university, insisting that their lives must continue until Lily returns. Meanwhile, Lily goes into premature labour and chokes Rick with her chain as he examines her. She steals his key to unlock herself, but her contractions prevent her from escaping before Rick pushes her down the stairs. Lily gives birth and passes out as Rick takes the baby away. When Lily comes to, Rick tells her she delivered a stillborn boy, which he blames on her escape attempt. He dismisses her claims that she heard the baby cry. Later, she attempts suicide by cutting herself with a glass shard, but Rick returns and dresses her wounds. He dissuades her from future attempts by threatening to kidnap Abby. Four more years pass. Rick unchains Lily and begins grooming another student, Abby and Wes become a couple, and Eve stockpiles birthday gifts for Lily. One day after routinely raping Lily, Rick leaves and fails to lock the basement door behind him.
3	"Escape"	Laura Way	Suzanne Cowie	8 January 2026
Rick realises he left the door unlocked and rushes back to the cottage, but Lily has already escaped into the woods. Lily hitches a ride with a passerby who takes her home, where she has a tearful reunion with Eve and Abby. Tommy and his partner Rachel arrive at the Riser house and persuade Lily to divulge her captor's name. At the hospital, Lily undergoes a sexual assault examination, which uncovers evidence of her past pregnancy. The Risers return home and hide from the media. Rick flees with his wife and young daughter Alice, telling Zoe that a student he'd briefly cheated with has falsely accused him of rape. He is soon arrested at a motel. In custody, he denies the charges and claims that Lily is obsessed with him since they slept together one time before she went missing. The police discover the cottage, but Rick has already torched it to destroy any evidence of Lily's captivity. Wes and Abby make efforts to hide their relationship from Lily, but she discovers them anyway and feels betrayed. Abby moves out of her and Wes's flat. Tommy, digging through old files, finds that Isobelle Yates, another of Rick's former students, is also missing. Zoe visits Rick in prison and he asks for her support. It is revealed that Alice is Lily's daughter.
4	"Showdown"	Laura Way	Nessa Muthy	8 January 2026
Tommy questions Rick about Isobelle, but he agrees to talk only to Lily. Lily recalls seeing Isobelle's initials scratched in the basement, but refuses to speak to Rick. Zoe publicly proclaims her belief in Rick's innocence. Abby discovers that she is pregnant by Wes. Wes and Lily reconnect, but he rejects her romantic advances. Rick is assaulted in prison by his fellow inmates. A female guard subsequently offers him protection in exchange for sexual favours. Lily and Abby reconcile and Lily learns of her sister's pregnancy, but she struggles with how everyone in her life has moved on. She agrees to speak to Rick if it means potentially finding another living captive. Lily visits Rick accompanied by Abby. During the interview, Rick refuses to discuss Isobelle and maintains that Lily fabricated the accusations out of spite, provoking Abby to attack him.
5	"Crisis"	Bindu De Stoppani	Nessa Muthy	8 January 2026
In a flashback, Rick presents the newborn Alice to Zoe. He claims that she is the product of a one-night stand with a student, who agreed to keep the pregnancy on the condition that Rick and his wife raise the baby. Zoe, desperate to be a mother, agrees to raise the child. In the present, Lily sinks further into her depression and distances herself from her family. Rick coaches Zoe as a character witness for his upcoming plea hearing. Investigators have failed to find the remains of Lily's supposedly stillborn son, so Tommy begins exploring the possibility that Alice is her child. At his request, Zoe produces Alice's forged birth certificate for him. Abby confronts Zoe at her home to berate her for continuing to stand by Rick. Seeing Alice, she is shocked by her resemblance to Lily and attempts to call the police, but Zoe knocks her out. While unwrapping her presents, Lily finds Abby's diary, detailing her guilt and despair over her sister's disappearance. Tommy pulls Zoe's medical records, which indicate that she underwent a hysterectomy and oophorectomy before Alice's birth and neglected to freeze her eggs. Eve and Wes attend the hearing while Lily stays home and Eve screams at Rick when he pleads innocent to the charges. When placed on the stand to advocate for Rick's release on bail, Zoe confesses to having been wilfully ignorant of Lily's captivity and expresses her belief in Rick's guilt. Afterwards, she drives away with Alice. Tommy discovers Abby and takes her home, where Abby tells Lily that Zoe's daughter is her baby. Outside the courthouse, Rick fakes a seizure and escapes when his handcuffs are removed.
6	"Manhunt"	Bindu De Stoppani	David Turpin	8 January 2026
Manhunts for Zoe and Rick commence while the Risers are moved to a safe house. Before leaving, Abby tells Wes about her pregnancy. Rick kills a stranger and uses his phone to call Lily. He claims he took her baby away to stop Lily from hurting her and that he will soon return to her. Zoe drives to a bridge with the intent of killing herself by jumping onto train tracks. However, authorities arrive and Zoe eventually breaks down. Alice is temporarily placed into foster care as a prerequisite to Lily eventually assuming custody. Lily becomes overwhelmed by fear and anguish over the situation and confides in Abby that she will never find peace until Rick is dead. Abby sneaks away and finds Rick in the cottage. During their altercation, Rick taunts Abby by revealing that he has killed multiple other girls before she fatally stabs him in the neck. Isobelle's remains are discovered and identified. Abby and Wes prepare for the birth of twins. Lily visits Alice's foster home and they play with dolls together.

== Production ==
The Hollie Overton novel Baby Doll was adapted for the six-part series for Paramount+ by David Turpin, Suzanne Cowie, and Nessa Muthy. Directing episodes are Laura Way and Bindu de Stoppani with Mick Pantaleo as producer. Executive producers include Suzi McIntosh for Clapperboard Studios and Mike Benson for Paramount+. Filming took place in June 2025. The title for the series was confirmed as Girl Taken in December 2025.

The cast is led by Jill Halfpenny and Alfie Allen, older and younger sisters Tallulah and Delphi Evans, respectively, as twins, alongside Niamh Walsh, Levi Brown, Victoria Ekanoye, Holly Atkins, Vikash Bhai and Kiran Krishnakumar.

== Release ==
The series premiered globally on Paramount+ on 8 January 2026.

== Reception ==
The review aggregator website Rotten Tomatoes reported an 80% approval rating based on 5 critic reviews.
