= Kormac =

Irish musician, producer, DJ and performer

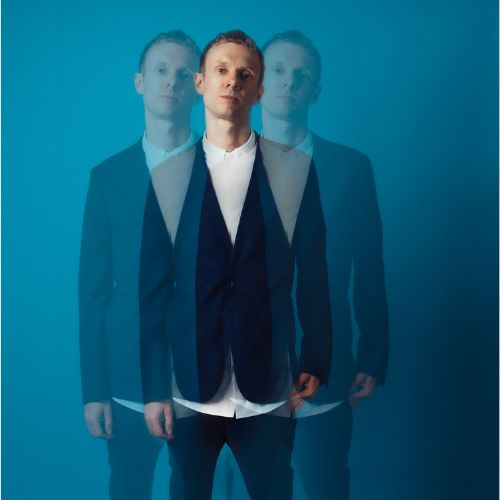

Background information
- Also known as: Kormac, DJ Kormac
- Born: Cormac O'Halloran
- Origin: Dublin, Ireland
- Genres: House, Electronic, Experimental
- Occupations: DJ, Producer, Composer
- Years active: 2007–present
- Labels: Always The Sound, Bodytonic, Scribble Records
- Website: kormacmusic.com

Cormac O'Halloran, better known by his stage name DJ Kormac or simply Kormac, is a Dublin-based composer, DJ, and producer renowned for blending organic recordings with expansive electronica. His work spans solo projects, collaborative releases, and film scoring, where he is celebrated for his innovative soundscapes.

Since 2019, Kormac has composed scores for several acclaimed TV series and feature films, including This Town, written by Steven Knight and aired on BBC One in early 2024. His other notable compositions include The Boy That Never Was starring Colin Morgan, The Diplomat featuring Sophie Rundle, and Swift Justice, an Emmy-nominated short film exploring the inner workings of a Taliban courtroom.

In 2022, after nearly a decade-long hiatus, Kormac released his third studio album Equivalent Exchange, featuring the Irish Chamber Orchestra. The project culminated in a sold-out performance at Dublin's National Concert Hall in early 2024.

== Career ==
Kormac began his musical journey as a hip-hop scratch DJ and MPC beat-maker, evolving into an artist with a distinctive approach to sound design. Known for transforming samples and acoustic recordings into innovative, genre-defying music, his style is marked by a meticulous blending of live instrumentation and electronic elements.

In the mid-2000s, Kormac was a turntablist and multi-instrumentalist with the Irish experimental band 8Ball, laying the foundation for his future exploration of electronic and acoustic fusion.

Kormac's first solo release, the Scratch Marchin' EP in 2007, highlighted his distinctive blend of hip-hop and electronic production. He soon expanded his live shows by forming Kormac's Big Band, a dynamic ensemble featuring brass, strings, drums, electronics, bass, and guitar. These performances became known for their high energy and innovative fusion of live instrumentation with electronic music, setting them apart in the live music scene.

In 2014, his track Wake Up, from the critically acclaimed album Doorsteps, was nominated for the Choice Music Prize for Irish Song of the Year. During the creation of Doorsteps, Kormac sought out collaborators in an unconventional manner—visiting the homes of icons like author Irvine Welsh, Mercury Music Prize winner Speech Debelle, and Texan singer-songwriter Micah P. Hinson, crafting an album that defied categorisation.

With Equivalent Exchange Kormac takes his music into a new direction. Kormac’s new album features a composition created with the Irish Chamber Orchestra and a diverse group of collaborators, including Loah, Jafaris, Jack O'Rourke, MayKay and poet Stephen James Smith. The visuals were developed with acclaimed artist Maser. Kormac’s success on stage at a sold‑out performance at Dublin’s National Concert Hall in 2024 highlights Kormac’s creativity and energy, as a live performer.

Over the years, Kormac has taken his performances to major festivals, including Glastonbury, Bestival, Electric Picnic, and Sonar. He has toured extensively across the UK, Europe, Australia, and Canada, sharing stages with legends such as Portishead, Nas, The Flaming Lips, Sonic Youth, and Snarky Puppy. His music has garnered over 80 million streams to date.

== TV & Film Scores ==
Kormac completed the score for The Boy That Never Was, a four-part series inspired by Karen Perry's bestselling novel. Starring Colin Morgan (The Crown) and Toni O'Rourke, the series aired on RTÉ on Sunday nights throughout Autumn 2024. It was beautifully directed by Hannah Quinn and produced by Subotica.

In early 2024, Kormac wrote an original score for Steven Knight's latest series, This Town. Kormac and his team shaped the series’ musical identity by integrating performances from Dan Carey, Kae Tempest, Gregory Porter, Celeste and Self-Esteem into his score. By weaving these elements into the score and deploying them throughout the series, Kormac achieved a unique and cohesive soundscape. The six-part series aired on BBC1 and iPlayer in Spring 2024 and was produced by Kudos TV. His OST for the series was released on Mercury in May 2024.

Prior to this, Kormac scored The Diplomat, a six-part series for ITV Studios produced by Word Productions (Line of Duty). The show, starring Sophie Rundle (Peaky Blinders), premiered on Alibi and Now TV in 2023.

Also in 2023, he composed the soundtrack for the Emmy-nominated documentary Swift Justicedocumentary for The New Yorker magazine. Directed by Ross McDonnell, the film explores the Afghani justice system under Taliban rule and has garnered over 1.5 million YouTube views. He also completed his first feature film score for Tarrac!

Kormac has also composed scores for the TV series Professionals (starring Brendan Fraser) and Red Election (starring Lydia Leonard and Stephen Dillane), both airing worldwide on Disney+ and in primetime in the U.S.

== Always The Sound ==
Always The Sound (A.T.S) is Kormac's independent label, serving as a creative hub for his diverse musical explorations. Under this label, he has released two studio albums and a variety of singles, including his latest album, Equivalent Exchange. A.T.S also features the original soundtrack for The Diplomat, as well as the main theme for The Boy That Never Was, featuring the soulful voice of Loah. Throughout 2023 and 2024, Kormac has continued to push artistic boundaries with a steady stream of single releases that reflect his evolving sound and vision.

== Discography ==
2024

- The Boy That Never Was (Theme) - Featuring Loah | Always The Sound
- This Town (Score from the Original BBC Series) | Mercury
- Waiting On You - Featuring MayKay | Always The Sound

2023

- The Diplomat - Original Television Soundtrack | Always The Sound
- Always The Sound - Featuring MayKay | Always The Sound

2022

- Equivalent Exchange (Studio Album) | Always The Sound
- Carry Weight - Featuring Loah | Always The Sound
- New Day (Remixes) - Featuring Jack O'Rourke, Narolane & New Spectrum | Always The Sound

2018

- Cortége - Kormac Remix | Reckless Records
- Causing Trouble (Kormac Remix) - Featuring Saint Sister & Jafaris
- New Day - Featuring Jack O'Rourke | Reckless Records

2017

- I Believe (Remixes) | Reckless Records
- I Believe (Single) | Reckless Records

2014

- Doorsteps (Studio Album) | Bodytonic

2012

- Superhero (Extended Single) | Scribble Records

2010

- Word Play (Studio Album) | Scribble Records

2008

- Good Lord (EP) | Scribble Records

2007

- Scratch Marchin' (EP) | Scribble Records

== Scores ==
2026

- Dear England - TV Mini Series (4 Episodes)

2024

- This Town - TV Series (6 Episodes)
- The Boy That Never Was - Limited TV Series (4 Episodes)

2023

- The Diplomat - TV Series (6 Episodes)
- Swift Justice - Short - Emmy-Nominated

2022

- Tarrac! - Feature Film

2021

- Red Election - TV Series (10 Episodes)

2020

- Professionals - TV Series (10 Episodes)

2019

- Kathleen - Short
