= A Walk in the Woods =

A Walk in the Woods may refer to:

- A Walk in the Woods (book), 1998, by Bill Bryson
- A Walk in the Woods (film), 2015, by Ken Kwapis, based on Bryson's book
- A Walk in the Woods (play), 1988, by Lee Blessing
