= Hidden in the Woods =

Hidden in the Woods may refer to:

- Hidden in the Woods (2012 film), a 2012 Chilean film
- Hidden in the Woods (2014 film), an American film (an English-language remake of the Chilean film)
