= Ben Rose (actor) =

English actor

- Education: Rose Bruford College
- Occupations: Actor, musician
- Years active: 2018–present
- Television: This Town

Benjamin Rose is a British actor and musician. He is known for playing a leading role in the 2024 TV drama series This Town.

== Early life and education ==
Benjamin Rose is from Ripley, Derbyshire.

He graduated from Rose Bruford College's actor musicianship course in 2017.

== Career ==
Rose is a musician, and has played as a rhythm guitarist for Miles Kane.

As an actor, he appeared in The Innocents and police drama Line of Duty, as well as long-running day-time soap opera Doctors.

Rose has a leading role as Bardon Quinn in 2024 Steven Knight musical drama series This Town for BBC One. He practised with his co-star Levi Brown, who was learning guitar for the series, and they attended an open mic night together at the Man of Kent pub in preparation for the show.

== Filmography ==
Year	Title	Role	Notes
2018	The Innocents	Welly	2 episodes
2021	Line of Duty	Jake	2 episodes
2022	Doctors	Felix	1 episode
2024	This Town	Bardon Quinn	Main role
