= The Watcher in the Woods (2017 film) =

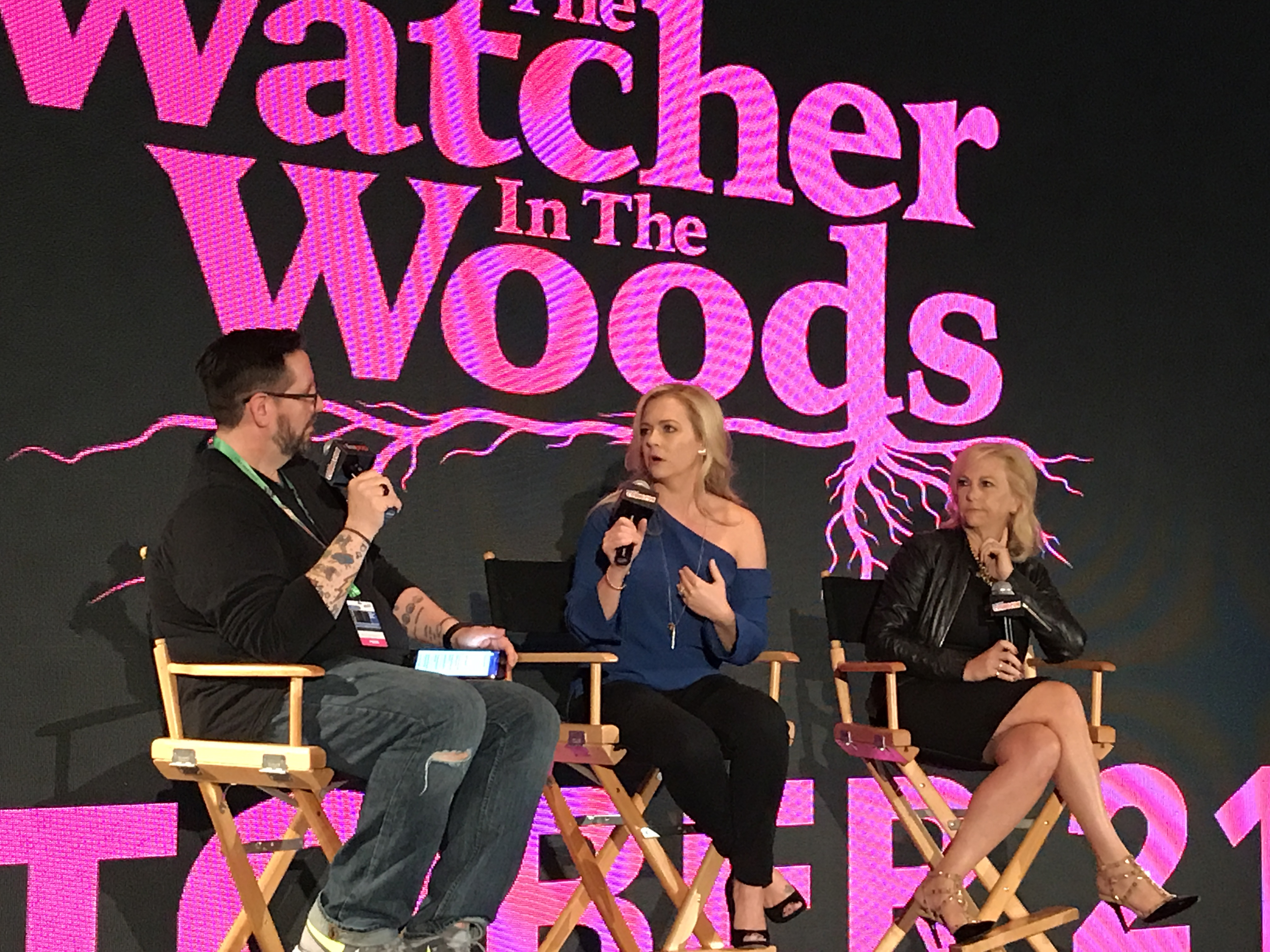
- Panel discussion on the film at the 2017 New York Comic Con. From left to right: Damian Holbrook of TV Guide, acting as emcee, Melissa Joan Hart, and Paula Hart.
- Based on: A Watcher in the Woods by Florence Engel Randall
- Screenplay by: Scott Abbott
- Directed by: Melissa Joan Hart
- Starring: Tallulah Evans; Nicholas Galitzine; Melanie Gutteridge; Rufus Wright; Dixie Egerickx; Anjelica Huston
- Theme music composer: Felix Bird
- Country of origin: United States
- Original language: English

Production
- Producer: Paula Hart
- Cinematography: Richard Stoddard
- Editor: Rob Pallatina
- Running time: 87 minutes
- Production company: Hartbreak Films

Original release
- Network: Lifetime
- Release: October 21, 2017

The Watcher in the Woods is a 2017 American made-for-television horror film directed by Melissa Joan Hart and starring Anjelica Huston. It is based on the 1976 novel A Watcher in the Woods by Florence Engel Randall, which had previously been adapted into the 1980 film of the same name. It premiered on Lifetime October 21, 2017.

== Plot ==
An American family, the Carstairs, have traveled to the Welsh countryside so the father, Paul, can conduct research over the summer. While the youngest daughter, Ellie, is more than happy with the trip, the eldest daughter Jan is resentful of having to leave their home in Ohio. Paul and his wife Kate choose to stay in Aylwood Manor and purchase Ellie a new doll to commemorate the occasion. Mrs. Aylwood, the home's owner, is initially resentful of the intruders but lets them remain after noticing that Jan can hear whispers from the nearby forest. That night Ellie names her new doll "Nerak" and Jan sees visions of a young girl in their bedroom mirror before it shatters in a perfect X. Her parents hear the commotion and accuse Jan of deliberately trying to frighten them away from the house.

The following day Jan meets a local boy, Mark, and the local oddball Helen, who tells them of the disappearance of Mrs. Aylwood's daughter Karen. The girl had been taken by a spirit inhabiting the forest, the Watcher, after Karen had played a prank involving her wearing a doctor's mask and robe and singing "Ring around the Rosie". Unnerved, the teens go to Mark's house with Ellie, where they see her write the name "Nerak" in a dusty window, showing that it is "Karen" spelled backwards. Later that night Ellie goes into a trance and starts screaming "Nerak". Jan follows Mrs. Aylwood into the forest the next day, resulting in her falling into some water and becoming encircled by roots when she hears her family calling for her. Paul and Kate find Mrs. Aylwood trying to free Jan, but assume that she was trying to drown her. Jan comes to her defense, endearing her to the woman. Mrs. Aylwood opens up to Jan and tells her that Karen was taken because the Watcher had assumed she was mocking him. The Watcher was originally a doctor who had been alive during the Black Plague. He had managed to keep the village essentially free from the disease, only for the villagers to turn on him when they discover that he was sick. The Watcher is willing to return Karen, as he's aware that she meant no offense, but wants either another child in her place or a "peeling". Unable to determine what the latter is, Mrs. Aylwood agreed to trade Ellie for Karen. She admits that she had since regretted the decision and went to the forest to make a new bargain, appealing to the Watcher's Hippocratic Oath so that he would leave Ellie alone but keep Karen. The two then hear the Watcher call out as they see visions of Karen, followed by him calling for Ellie. Jan decides that she will save her sister and get Karen back by recreating Karen's prank, in hopes that the Watcher will either explain the "peeling" or take her in Ellie's place.

That night the family goes to the local carnival, where Jan and Mark gather Karen's friends. Their departure is noticed by her family, who return home because they assumed that she had gone to Aylwood Manor. They find the house empty and Mrs. Aylwood informs them of Jan's plans, resulting in them all going to the forest in hopes of saving Jan. Meanwhile Jan's plans result in her being taken by the Watcher to another dimension, where she is able to find Karen, who believes that only a day has passed. Back in the living world, Mark realizes that the Watcher was actually asking for a "pealing" - for the church bell to be rung for each year of his life so he can pass on to the other side. He runs to the church and rings the bell, which satisfies the Watcher. The girls are both returned and overjoyed, they all return to Aylwood Manor.

== Cast ==
- Tallulah Evans as Jan Carstairs
- Nicholas Galitzine as Mark Fleming
- Melanie Gutteridge as Kate Carstairs
- Rufus Wright as Paul Carstairs
- Dixie Egerickx as Ellie Carstairs
- Anjelica Huston as Mrs. Aylwood
- Benedict Taylor as John Keller
- Melanie Walters as Helen Taylor
- Rebecca Acock as Karen Aylwood

== Production ==
During the early production process the decision was made to eliminate the science-fiction elements present in the novel and the 1980 film in order to "ensure their story was more cohesive" and make it a "more straightforward supernatural story." Anjelica Huston was brought on to portray Mrs. Aylwood and Tallulah Evans the film's protagonist, Jan. Melissa Joan Hart was confirmed as director and executive producer, working on a screenplay adapted from the novel by Scott Abbott. Hart had been a fan of the 1980 film and had spent approximately seventeen years trying to obtain the rights to film an updated version of the story.

During filming Hart used her iPhone to shoot the underwater scenes. Hart was also unable to film at night, so black magic lenses were used to simulate nighttime.

== Release ==
The Watcher in the Woods first aired on the Lifetime Channel on October 17, 2017, and was given a Region 1 home video release on September 11, 2018.

== Reception ==
Brian Costello of Common Sense Media awarded the film two stars out of five. Jessica Shaw of Entertainment Weekly graded the film a C−.
