= Robert Popper =

British producer, writer and actor

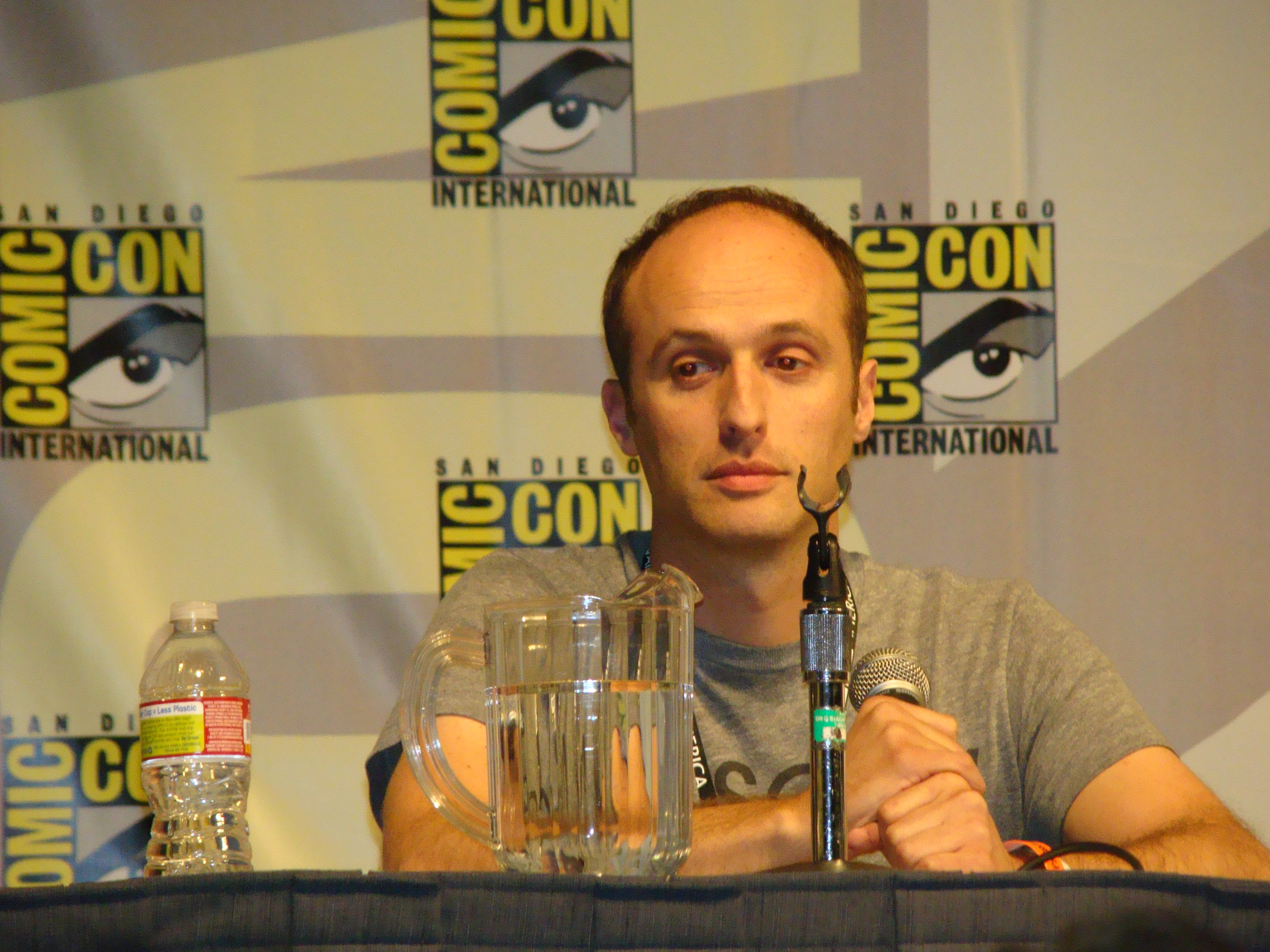
- Popper at the 22 July 2010 Look Around You panel at San Diego Comic-Con
- Born: Robert Darren Popper; 23 November 1967 (age 58); Marylebone, London, England
- Other name: Robin Cooper
- Occupations: Writer; producer; actor
- Years active: 1995–present

Robert Darren Popper (born 23 November 1967) is a British comedy producer, writer, actor, and author, best known as co-creator of the mock BBC documentary Look Around You, and creator of Channel 4's sitcom Friday Night Dinner. He also wrote the books The Timewaster Letters, Return of The Timewaster Letters and The Timewaster Diaries under the pseudonym Robin Cooper.

== Early life ==
Popper was educated at Haberdashers' Aske's Boys' School and is Jewish.

== Career ==
=== Television and film ===
Popper began his career in British television working for The Comic Strip under Peter Richardson. He then worked on the Channel 4 show, The Big Breakfast, writing for comedy puppets Zig and Zag. He also made his first appearance as a comedian on The Eleven O'Clock Show as the character Simon Michael Simon. Later, he was employed as a commissioning editor for entertainment and comedy at Channel 4.

His commissioning credits include the series Bo' Selecta!, Black Books, Spaced and Bremner, Bird and Fortune. He commissioned three series of the Comedy Lab whilst at the channel. He left the role to work on the first series of Look Around You (2002) with Peter Serafinowicz. Look Around You was a spoof educational science comedy that ran on BBC2. It was written and produced by Popper (who featured onscreen in one episode as "Jack Morgan", also performing the rock song "Little Mouse") and Serafinowicz (who appeared more frequently). The pair wrote and played all the music in the series. Look Around You was nominated for a BAFTA and a British Comedy Award. In 2003, Popper co-wrote the short film Hello Friend with Graham Linehan.

In 2005, Popper returned to the screen with a second series of Look Around You, again co-written by him and Serafinowicz. Made up of six half-hour shows, Look Around You 2 resembled an early-80s Tomorrow's World. Popper appeared in all six episodes as Jack Morgan. Besides Popper and Serafinowicz, the series featured Josie D'Arby and Olivia Colman as presenters. Look Around You 2 won the Rose D'Or TV Award in 2006 for Best Comedy Series. Popper was a programme consultant and co-writer for the TV sketch comedy The Peter Serafinowicz Show (2007), in which he also made several brief on-screen appearances.

Popper was the producer for the third and fourth seasons of Channel 4's Peep Show, and acted as script editor for a number of episodes in seasons 5, 6, 7 and 9.

Both series won the British Comedy Award for Best Comedy, and Popper won a BAFTA for series 4. Popper was the script editor on all three series of The Inbetweeners. He was also the script editor on Graham Linehan's The IT Crowd and the BBC3 comedy Him & Her.

In 2009, Popper and Serafinowicz wrote, produced, and performed in a 30-minute podcast entitled The Other Side. The comedy purported to be a radio show coming from the only radio station ("Radio Spiritworld") to broadcast from the afterlife. Robert and Peter also created the online world religion, Tarvuism, making a variety of shorts. The pair created a number of web videos on YouTube showcasing their surreal humour, including "Birds of Britain", "Markets of Britain" and "Intermission".

On 28 July 2010, Popper and Serafinowicz added a new narration track to an episode of "Out Of Town" by Jack Hargreaves in order to create the spoof film "Markets of Britain, a short film by Lee Titt"

Popper wrote on the fourteenth series of South Park; he was signed up by creators Matt Stone and Trey Parker following a week-long brainstorming session, and worked on the final four episodes of the first half-season.

Popper created, wrote and produced six series of the Channel 4 sitcom Friday Night Dinner. Series 1 aired from February to April 2011 and won the Rose D'or Award for Best Sitcom. It received two BAFTA nominations and four British Comedy Award nominations. Popper said that the family setting of Friday Night Dinner drew on his regular Shabbat visits to his parents, although he deliberately avoided making the sitcom explicitly religious.

Popper also co-wrote the first three episodes of Stath Lets Flats with Jamie Demetriou in 2018. He also created and wrote I Hate You for Channel 4, starring Tanya Reynolds and Melissa Saint. It dropped on All 4 in September 2022 and aired on C4 in October 2022.

Popper had a small, uncredited role in Edgar Wright's 2004 film Shaun of the Dead, in which he played a news reporter, and also appeared in Wright's next film, Hot Fuzz (2007), credited as "Not Janine". He reprised his Look Around You character, Jack Morgan, for an appearance in the music video for Frankie & The Heartstrings' 2011 single "Hunger".

=== Books ===
Popper wrote the books The Timewaster Letters and Return of the Timewaster Letters under the pseudonym Robin Cooper. The books were a set of madcap letters he wrote to weird associations and hobby groups. The books became bestsellers and have so far sold over 300,000 copies. The third "Robin Cooper" book, The Timewaster Diaries, was published in 2007, was serialised on Radio 4's Book of the Week programme 16–20 July 2007, read by Paul Whitehouse. The Timewaster Letters was released in the US in the summer of 2008.

== Tangerinegate ==
Popper was responsible for a minor hoax regarding Gordon Brown in February 2010 known as "Tangerinegate". Popper, who often makes prank phone calls, rang up London radio station LBC claiming he had seen Brown throw a tangerine into a laminating machine during a fit of rage, breaking the machine. This hoax was reported as a true event in The Daily Telegraph as well as being referenced (as 'alleged') on comedy news show The Bubble. The Financial Times (FT) website published a blog post, stating its belief that the story was a hoax. The FT also reported on the emergence of a computer-animated version of the events from Hong Kong. Similar stories regarding Gordon Brown having temper tantrums were widely published in the British media during February 2010, following publicity about Andrew Rawnsley's book The End of the Party.

The Financial Times later issued a follow-up post acknowledging the hoax.

== Awards ==
Friday Night Dinner (Series 1)

Writer/Producer
Winner: Best Sitcom, Rose d'Or Awards 2012
Winner: Best Format, MIPCOM, 2012
Winner: Best Sitcom, Montreux Comedy Festival, 2011
Winner: RTS Craft Award, Best Editing, Sitcom 2011
Nominated: BAFTA, Best Sitcom
Nominated British Comedy Awards, Best Sitcom 2011
Nominated British Comedy Awards, Best New Comedy 2011
Nominated Best Writer, Comedy, RTS Awards 2011
Nominated Best Comedy, Broadcast Awards 2012
Nominated, Best Comedy, Televisual Awards, 2011
Nominated Best New Programme, Broadcast Awards 2012

Praise Tarvu

Short Film co/written/produced with Peter Serafinowicz
Winner: Best Comedy, Campfire Film Festival, Australia, 2009

Peep Show (Series 4)

Producer
Winner: BAFTA, Best Sitcom, 2008
Winner British Comedy Award, Best Comedy Series, 2007
Winner of the Monte Carlo International TV Festival, Best Comedy
Winner, Best Comedy Performance, RTS Awards, 2008
Nominated RTS Awards, Best Sit Com, 2008

Peep Show (Series 3)

Producer
Winner: British Comedy Awards, Best Comedy Series, 2006
Nominated: BAFTA, Situation Comedy 2006
Winner: South Bank Awards for Best Comedy, 2006
Nominated for a Broadcast Award, Best Comedy, 2006

Look Around You (Series 2)

Co-Writer, Co-Star, Co-Producer, Co-Composer (with Peter Serafinowicz)
Winner: Best Comedy, Rose D’Or Awards, 2006
Winner: Arena Magazine Awards for Best Comedy Show 2005
DVD: Nominated for a DVDA award, Best Comedy DVD, 2006

Look Around You (Series 1)

Co-Writer, Co-Star, Co-Producer, Co-Composer (with Peter Serafinowicz)
Nominated: BAFTA, Best Comedy Series, 2003
Nominated: British Comedy Award, Best New Comedy, 2003
Winner: Amazon.co.uk’s UK Comedy DVD of the year, 2003

Look Around You: Calcium

Co-Writer, Co-Producer, Co-Composer with Peter Serafinowicz, 20-minute comedy short film, 2001
Winner: London Portobello Film Festival (Springfest)
Special Mentions: Milan, Leeds, and Bradford Film Festivals
Finalist: London Greenwich Film Festival
