= The Watcher in the Woods (1980 film) =

1980 film by John Hough and Vincent McEveety

- Theatrical release poster
- Directed by: John Hough (Note: Vincent McEveety served as an uncredited director for a revised ending which was incorporated into the film following a poor audience response during its brief initial 1980 release.)
- Screenplay by: Brian Clemens; Harry Spalding; Rosemary Anne Sisson
- Based on: A Watcher in the Woods by Florence Engel Randall
- Produced by: Ron Miller
- Starring: Bette Davis; Carroll Baker; David McCallum; Lynn-Holly Johnson; Kyle Richards; Ian Bannen; Richard Pasco
- Cinematography: Alan Hume
- Edited by: Geoffrey Foot
- Music by: Stanley Myers
- Production company: Walt Disney Productions
- Distributed by: Buena Vista Distribution
- Release dates: April 17, 1980 (New York City); October 9, 1981 (U.S.)
- Running time: 84 minutes
- Countries: United Kingdom; United States
- Language: English
- Budget: $6 million–$9 million
- Box office: $5 million

The Watcher in the Woods is a 1980 supernatural horror film directed by John Hough and starring Bette Davis, Carroll Baker, Lynn-Holly Johnson, Kyle Richards, and David McCallum. Based on the 1976 novel by Florence Engel Randall, the film tells the story of an American teenage girl and her younger sister who become entangled in a decades-long missing person case involving a girl who disappeared in the woods surrounding their new home in the English countryside.

A co-production between the United Kingdom and the United States, The Watcher in the Woods was one of several live-action films produced by Walt Disney Productions in the 1980s, when the studio was targeting young adult audiences, and was among their earliest films to receive PG-rating in the United States. Principal photography took place at Pinewood Studios and the surrounding areas in Buckinghamshire, England, in 1979.

The Watcher in the Woods had its world premiere at the Ziegfeld Theatre in New York City on April 17, 1980, but was pulled from release after ten days, and future screenings were canceled by the studio because of an overwhelming negative response from critics and audiences. Several changes were made thereafter, including the excision of a pre-credits sequence, as well the filming of an entirely new ending, which was directed by Vincent McEveety without Hough's involvement. Disney re-released the revised cut of the film on October 9, 1981, and it grossed $5 million.

Though critical response to the film was varied and included numerous unfavorable reviews, the film went on to gain a cult following in the years following its release. Another adaptation of the novel was released for television in 2017 starring Anjelica Huston.

== Plot ==
Americans Helen and Paul Curtis and their daughters, Jan and Ellie, move into a manor in rural England. Mrs. Aylwood, the owner of the residence who now lives in the guest house next door, notices that Jan bears a striking resemblance to her daughter, Karen, who disappeared inside an abandoned chapel in the woods thirty years earlier.

Jan senses something unusual about the property almost immediately and begins to see strange blue lights in the woods, as well as triangles and glowing objects. On one occasion, she sees the apparition of a blindfolded girl in a mirror in front of her. Shortly after the family settles in, Ellie goes to buy a puppy she inexplicably names "Nerak". After seeing the reflection of the name "Nerak" (Karen spelled backwards), Jan is told about the mystery of Mrs. Aylwood's missing daughter by Mike Fleming, the teenage son of a local woman, Mary.

One afternoon, Nerak runs into the woods and Ellie chases after him. Jan, realising that her sister has disappeared from the yard, goes into the woods to find her, eventually locating her at a pond. In the water, she sees a blue circle of light and is blinded by a flash, causing her to fall in; she nearly drowns, but Mrs. Aylwood saves her. Mrs. Aylwood brings Jan and Ellie to her home, and recounts the night her daughter disappeared.

Later, Mike discovers that his mother was with Karen when she disappeared, but she evades his questions. Meanwhile, Jan attempts to get information from John Keller, a reclusive aristocrat who was also there that night, but he refuses to speak to her. On her way home, Jan cuts through the woods, where she encounters a local hermit, Tom Colley, who tells Jan he was also present at Karen's disappearance. He claims that during a seance-like initiation ceremony on the night of a lunar eclipse, Karen vanished when lightning struck the church bell tower.

Jan decides to recreate the ceremony during an upcoming solar eclipse, hoping it will bring Karen back. She gathers Mary, Tom and John at the abandoned chapel, and they attempt to repeat the ceremony. Meanwhile, Ellie, while watching the eclipse from the front yard, suddenly goes into a trance-like state, apparently possessed, and enters the woods. At the chapel, the ceremony is interrupted by a powerful wind that shatters the windows, and Ellie appears. In a voice that is not her own, she explains that an accidental switch took place thirty years ago, in which Karen traded places with an alien presence from an alternate dimension; thus, the Watcher has been haunting the woods since, while Karen has remained suspended in time.

The Watcher leaves Ellie's body, manifesting as a pillar of light, fueled by the "circle of friendship". It engulfs Jan and lifts her into the air, but Mike intercedes and pulls her away before the Watcher disappears. Simultaneously, the eclipse ends, and Karen, still the same age as when she disappeared, reappears – still blindfolded. She removes the blindfold just as Mrs. Aylwood enters the chapel.

== Cast ==
- Bette Davis as Mrs. Aylwood
- Carroll Baker as Helen Curtis
- David McCallum as Paul Curtis
- Lynn-Holly Johnson as Jan Curtis
- Kyle Richards as Ellie Curtis
- Ian Bannen as John Keller
- Richard Pasco as Tom Colley
- Frances Cuka as Mary Fleming
- Benedict Taylor as Mike Fleming
- Eleanor Summerfield as Mrs. Thayer
- Georgina Hale as Young Mrs. Aylwood
- Katharine Levy as Karen Aylwood

== Production ==
=== Development ===
The Watcher in the Woods is based on Florence Engel Randall's 1976 novel A Watcher in the Woods. Producer Tom Leetch pitched the project to Disney executive Ron Miller, stating that "This could be our Exorcist." Brian Clemens adapted the novel into a screenplay. However, Disney decided that Clemens' version—which had a different conclusion than that of the novel—was "too dark and threatening and black," and had Rosemary Anne Sisson revise it. This script was later revised again by Gerry Day in July 1979. Miller recruited John Hough to direct the film after seeing his previous movie, The Legend of Hell House with Roddy McDowall.

=== Casting ===
According to director John Hough during his audio commentary on the 2002 Anchor Bay DVD release, casting the role of the young Mrs. Aylwood was complicated, since the character is featured in two separate time periods; Bette Davis, who was already cast as Mrs. Aylwood, was considered for playing both the young and old versions of the character.

"You couldn't play a scene with Bette Davis and not really think and not be on your toes, as you just wouldn't have any impact on the scene at all."

— John Hough, 2002

According to Hough, Davis "desperately" wanted to play both parts; so much so, that the production crew had make-up and hair specialists flown in from Los Angeles in order to work on Davis in preparation for screen tests; the goal was to reverse her age appearance by thirty years. After the screen tests were completed and viewed by the crew, Hough was concerned about Davis playing the younger character, and felt that the make-up and hair work had "maybe knocked about twenty years off of her age, but not forty"; Davis was 72 years old at the time. Upon viewing the tests, Hough cued for the crew to leave the screening room, and said, "Bette, I don't think you've made it". After taking one long drag from her cigarette, Davis replied: "You're goddamn right". British actress Georgina Hale ended up taking the role of the younger Mrs. Aylwood; according to Hough, she took the part largely because of her admiration for Davis.

In casting the leading part of Jan, Diane Lane had been the initial choice, but she declined. The part eventually went to Lynn-Holly Johnson, who had gained attention in the United States as a professional figure skater, as well as for her acting role as a blind ice skater in the 1978 film Ice Castles, for which she received a Golden Globe nomination.

Carroll Baker, who was living in London at the time, was asked to play the part for Hough (who had long admired her work). She accepted the role. Eleven-year-old Kyle Richards—who played Ellie, the youngest sister in the film—had previously worked with Hough on Escape to Witch Mountain in an uncredited role as a younger version of her sister, Kim Richards. Kyle, who had a "somber" and "more serious" disposition to that of her sister, had previously appeared in several horror films, particularly The Car (1977) and Halloween (1978).

The film's principal cast was formally announced in September 1979.

=== Filming ===
Principal photography for The Watcher of the Woods began in August 1979. Sources state the film's production budget was between $6 million and $9 million. The film was shot primarily at Pinewood Studios in Buckinghamshire, England and in Stratford-upon-Avon, Warwickshire.

St. Hubert's Manor, the house used in the film, was located near Iver Heath; it has since been deconstructed and turned into apartments. Hough used several locations that are also seen in Robert Wise's The Haunting, most notably the grand mansion in which John Keller's character lives; this was the same house used for filming The Haunting (Ettington Park, Warwickshire). The shoot lasted a total of twelve weeks. During filming, producer Ron Miller would often intervene to tone down intense scenes, leading to "unhappy compromises" between him and the filmmakers.

==== Special effects ====
The special effects sequences (much of which appear in the film's excised alternate endings) were completed at Disney studios in Burbank, California by Harrison Ellenshaw after filming in England was completed. Ellenshaw's previous credits included Star Wars (1977) and The Black Hole (1979). Art Cruickshank and Bob Broughton oversaw the photographic effects, while Cruickshank completed miniature photography. Hough was disappointed with the way the alien appeared on film, and recalled: "The animation was out of my control. I had no say. The last four minutes undid all the good work of the previous 87 minutes when the monster came out,” he continues. “It moved in a very stiff way, and it really wasn’t up to what we were later going to see in later films."

=== Post-production ===
==== Ending reshoots ====
The film's original intended ending featured an appearance by the growling Watcher, a skeletal, insectoid alien, which picks Jan up in the chapel and disappears. At this point, the two were supposed to fly across an alien landscape to the Watcher's crippled spacecraft. Inside, Karen was trapped in a pyramidal prism. According to Sam Nicholson, the visual effects supervisor, "For some reason, the girl who disappeared imbalanced this alien's craft when she went through this portal. Which in turn caused this alien to crash." Jan reached out to Karen, and when the two embraced they were teleported back to the chapel. The girls then returned to the manor, where Mrs. Aylwood and her daughter were reunited. As they walk arm in arm, Jan explains everything to Ellie: the Watcher – who was switched with Karen by accident during the eclipse – needed Jan to free the girl. The visual effects for the "other world" scenes were not finished in time for the release because the film was rushed out to coincide with Bette Davis's 50th anniversary as a film actor in 1980 (Davis was first hired by Universal Studios in 1930). Rather than finish the existing effects shots, Disney opted to rewrite and reshoot the ending, toning down the references to the occult.

The first official theatrical ending, which was shown in the film's brief 1980 screening in New York City (see Release history) featured only part of the original ending, eliminating the "other world" sequence and replacing it with Helen's interrogation of Tom, Mary, and John at the chapel, after Jan disappears during their re-enactment of the séance. It did, however, include the appearance of the alien creature as it picks up Jan and disappears into thin air. While Helen is questioning everyone in the chapel, Jan re-appears, and emerges from a beam of light, hand-in-hand with Karen. The girls return to the house, where Mrs. Aylwood and Karen are re-united in the front yard, and Jan discusses the watcher with Ellie. This ending forced the film to rely on Jan's brief, cryptic explanation to provide closure. This conclusion to The Watcher in the Woods was nearly unintelligible as a result, thus giving the film the reputation of not having an ending. It also omitted Mrs. Aylwood's condemnation of recreating the séance on the basis that it was witchcraft.

Final 1981 theatrical ending of the film, which was shot by Vincent McEveety; this ending includes no physical manifestation of the Watcher apart from an eerie beam of light.

After critical backlash during the film's limited theatrical run in New York on April 17, 1980, the film was pulled from theaters and reshoots of its ending began without director Hough in the late spring of 1980. Several new potential endings were penned by various writers at Disney to substitute for the original. In addition to the work of studio writers, a number of science fiction writers, including Robert Silverberg, Joe Haldeman, and the Niven/Pournelle team, all working separately, were brought in and paid for alternate endings, but apparently none of those were used. Harrison Ellenshaw, the visual effects designer, later stated that there were "roughly 152" possible endings. Ellenshaw wrote the version of the ending that eventually accompanied the final 1981 re-released version of the film.

Due to the 1980 actors strike, Davis was unable to return to England to film reshoots, so her additional footage was shot in California. The 1981 theatrical release is the "official" version of the film and can be found on any VHS, laserdisc, or DVD release of The Watcher in the Woods (except for Blu-ray). It is summarized above in the film's synopsis. In this third, official ending, the re-imagined Watcher (an ectoplasmic pillar of light) was less threatening and more supernatural. The nature of Karen and the Watcher's switch was clearly explained by Ellie in the chapel (whilst possessed by the Watcher). The new footage (including the forest scenes that replaced the original opening credits) was directed by Vincent McEveety, although he was not credited due to union rules which forbade a screen credit unless the director worked on the film for a certain number of hours.

==== Excised opening scene ====
In addition to the replaced ending, the film's opening sequence was also changed: In Hough's original cut, the opening credits sequence was played after a sequence in which a young girl playing in the woods encounters the Watcher, who strikes her doll with a blue beam of light, incinerating it.

== Release ==
=== Theatrical run ===
The Watcher in the Woods had a limited release showing at New York City's Ziegfeld Theatre beginning April 17, 1980. Initially, the studio had planned to expand the film's release to between 600 and 700 theaters by June 1980. However, following an overwhelmingly negative reaction from audiences and critics, the film was pulled from the Ziegfeld Theater after only 10 days, and other scheduled screenings were canceled. The negative response prompted Disney to undertake reshoots of the film's ending, which cost the production an additional $1 million. In its place, Disney re-released Mary Poppins (1964).

Eigteen months later, after rewrites and reshoots of the film's ending were completed, the film was re-released on October 9, 1981. Promotional material for the film presented it as a straightforward suspense film aimed for more mature audiences, a new endeavor for Disney; the film's theatrical trailer began with a title card reading:

Walt Disney Productions ushers in a new decade of motion picture entertainment with the following invitation to spend ninety minutes on the edge of your seat.

The re-release was regionally staggered, with the film opening on the East Coast first, and expanding to the West Coast in late November 1981.

=== Home media ===
The film was released on VHS in the 1980s. In 1999, Anchor Bay Entertainment announced a special edition DVD release of the film, but it was removed from their schedule shortly after and delayed indefinitely. Anchor Bay released the film three years after their initial announcement, on April 2, 2002. Their edition of the film features an audio commentary with director Hough, three theatrical trailers, a television spot, as well as two alternate endings viewable separate from the film: the "other world" footage as an abbreviated (14 minute long) and unfinished alternate ending. The second alternate ending (6 minutes long) is an approximation of the first theatrical ending. An article later appeared to explain the release history, difficulties and potential future version on the digitalcinema.info website.

Walt Disney Studios Home Entertainment re-released a Region 2 DVD of the film in early 2004, and in the United States on August 3, 2004. Hough's audio commentary commissioned for the Anchor Bay release is not present on this disc.

On September 7, 2021, the film was released via US only Blu-ray exclusively through the now closed Disney Movie Club. The Blu-ray features the previously unreleased alternate opening as part of its bonus materials.

The film is noticeably absent from streaming on Disney+.

== Reception ==
=== Box office ===
During its original April 17, 1980 run in New York City, the film grossed only $40,000 before being pulled from theaters due to poor audience response. It was re-released on October 9, 1981, on 240 screens, and grossed $1.2 million during its opening week. It went on to gross a total of $5 million domestically.

=== Critical response ===
==== Initial run ====
Vincent Canby of The New York Times panned the film during its original 1980 theatrical run, writing: "I challenge even the most indulgent fan to give a coherent translation of what passes for an explanation at the end." He also criticized the special effects, noting that the creature in the film's finale "looks as if it had been stolen from a Chinese New Year's parade." Kathleen Carroll of the New York Daily News similarly deemed it a "somewhat tantalizing but ultimately ridiculous suspense movie." Gene Shalit of Ladies Home Journal also criticized the film, writing: "The Watcher in the Woods wastes the talents of Bette Davis and wastes our time with the non-talents of two children who speak in monotones... This dreary Disney movie may scare some ten-year-old girls who enjoy teenage mysteries, but parents and other adults will be exasperated. In a review published in Essence, Bonnie Allen noted: "I could not figure out what audience the film was made for. The plot has no new twist on the haunted English mansion scenario. Bette Davis, as the mother of the hauntee, is not enough to legitimize this horrid horror. As a matter of fact, The Watcher in the Woods is best left unwatched." Jim Wright of the Hackensack Record similarly felt the film was unoriginal, and that "when the payoff arrives... it is filled with absurdities rather than answers."

A review published in Variety gave the film a middling review, noting: "The acting and writing are barely professional but the art direction, especially Alan Hume’s stunning camerawork, gives the pic a gloss." At the time, producer Miller stated he felt the film had fared poorly with critics and audiences because "most of the film is a mysterious suspenseful movie but ends with a sci-fi twist. We're now looking for a more clever ending." Al Frank of the Morristown Daily Record felt that, though the film had a flawed conclusion, "John Hough's direction mixes the light with the spooky so well you're always surprised at what comes next." The Central New Jersey Home News's Ted Serrill noted that the film was "entertaining without let-up" and praised its cinematography, concluding that it "will do as a tasty forerunner of The Shining, which is to come next month."

Christopher John reviewed The Watcher in the Woods in Ares Magazine #3 and commented that "It must be put on record that for a studio unused to being totally serious, this is a big step forward. The Watcher In The Woods takes its creators quite a distance from the syrup of Disney's past. It is just unfortunate that a baby's first steps are usually awkward, stumbling ones."

==== Re-release ====
The film's second theatrical run with a brand new ending garnered it some critical praise, with The Hollywood Reporter calling it a "A rattlingly good suspense yarn. The ending is seamless, satisfying, resolving the mystery. The film is genuinely eerie and scary." An article published in The New York Times commented on the revised version of the film, writing: "The early good reviews for the revised Watcher in the Woods do not, by any means, solve all of Disney's problems. The PG-rated (Parental Guidance Suggested) movie is tense and scary enough to appeal to the teen-age audience that the studio has been trying to woo for the last four or five years. But can any film with a Disney label attract teen-agers?"

A review published in TV Guide criticized the film even with the revised ending and gave it one out of four stars, noting: "From the start it's apparent that [the setting] is no ordinary glen teeming with cute little Disney squirrels. Johnson, however, isn't intimidated by the woods, but strange incidents begin occurring when she becomes possessed by the spirit of Davis's long-dead daughter. Though the filmmakers make some effort to create a creepy atmosphere, they fail at one of horror's most basic formats—the haunted house story." Michael Blowen of The Boston Globe was also critical, deeming Davis "sour-faced," adding: "Everything in the film—direction, acting, writing, music arrangements, and editing—is as transparent as Casper the Friendly Ghost."

As of March 2024, The Watcher in the Woods holds a rating of 52% on Rotten Tomatoes based on 25 reviews with the consensus: "The Watcher in the Woods boasts plenty of spooky atmosphere and a typically strong performance from Bette Davis, but it builds to a conclusion so dissatisfying that it undermines all that came before."

=== Accolades ===
Award/association	Year	Category	Recipient	Result	Ref.
Saturn Awards	1982	Best International Film	The Watcher in the Woods	Nominated	
Saturn Awards	1982	Best Supporting Actress	Kyle Richards	Nominated	
Stinkers Bad Movie Awards	1981	Worst Supporting Actress	Lynn-Holly Johnson (Note: Shared with her performance in For Your Eyes Only.)	Nominated	
Stinkers Bad Movie Awards	1981	Worst Performance by a Child in a Featured Role	Kyle Richards	Won	
Young Artist Awards	1981	Best Young Motion Picture Actress	Kyle Richards	Nominated	

== See also ==
- List of films featuring eclipses
- The Watcher in the Woods (2017 film), a second adaptation of the book

== Sources ==
- Antunes, Filipa (2020). Children Beware!: Childhood, Horror and the PG-13 Rating. Jefferson, North Carolina: McFarland & Company. ISBN 978-1-476-63895-9.
- Dixon, Wheeler W. (2000). The Second Century of Cinema: The Past and Future of the Moving Image. Albany, New York: SUNY Press. ISBN 978-0-791-44515-0. OCLC 79251205. Archived from the original on September 28, 2024.
- McFarlane, Brian; Slide, Anthony, eds. (January 2013). The Encyclopedia of British Film (Fourth ed.). Manchester, England: Manchester University Press. ISBN 978-0-719-09139-1. OCLC 882132154. Archived from the original on September 28, 2024.
- Muir, John Kenneth (2012). Horror Films of the 1980s. Vol. 1. Jefferson, North Carolina: McFarland & Company. ISBN 978-0-786-47298-7. OCLC 840902442.
- Stanley, John (2000). Creature Features: The Science Fiction, Fantasy, and Horror Movie Guide. New York City, New York: Berkley Boulevard Books. ISBN 978-0-425-17517-0. OCLC 923854390. Archived from the original on September 28, 2024.
- "The Watcher in the Woods" (PDF) (Press release). Los Angeles, California: Buena Vista Distribution. 1980 – via Internet Archive.
