= House in the Woods (disambiguation) =

House in the Woods is a solitaire card game.

House in the Woods may also refer to:

== Literature ==
- The House in the Woods, a 1969 novel by Leslie Lance
- The House in the Woods, a 1991 novel by Isabelle Holland
- The House in the Woods, a 2020 novel by Mark Dawson
- The House in the Woods, a 2021 novel by Yvette Fielding

== Music ==
- "House in the Woods," a song by Tom Petty from Wildflowers
- House in the Woods (album), by Low Roar

== Other ==
- Huis ten Bosch palace in the Netherlands, translated and anglicized as "House in the Woods"

== See also ==
- "The House in the Wood", a German fairy tale
- The House in the Forest, a 1928 novel by Katharine Tynan
