= Don't Go in the Woods =

Don't Go in the Woods may refer to:

- Don't Go in the Woods (1981 film), a 1981 slasher film directed by James Bryan
- Don't Go in the Woods (2010 film), a 2010 horror musical directed by Vincent D'Onofrio
