= Jane Resh Thomas =

American children's writer (1936–2023)

- Born: August 15, 1936 Kalamazoo, Michigan, U.S.
- Died: June 12, 2023 (aged 86) Bloomington, Minnesota, U.S.

Jane Resh Thomas (August 15, 1936 – June 12, 2023) was an American children's writer and critic.

== Biography ==
Jane Resh Thomas was born on August 15, 1936, in Kalamazoo, Michigan, to Thelma (Scott) and Reed Beneval Resh. She graduated from the Bronson School of Nursing in 1957 and received a BA and MA from the University of Minnesota in 1967 and 1971, respectively. Thomas began her career as a freelance writer in 1972 after working as a nurse and an English teacher at the University of Minnesota.

Thomas's first book, Elizabeth Catches a Fish (1977), was based on childhood memories of fishing. Many of her other books draw on personal experience. In addition to her writing for children, Thomas wrote a column about children's literature for the Minneapolis Tribune (now the Star Tribune); as of 1982, she had written the column for a decade.

Thomas died in Bloomington, Minnesota on June 12, 2023, at the age of 86.

== List of Works ==
- Elizabeth Catches a Fish, illustrated by Joseph Duffy, Seabury Press (New York, NY), 1977.
- The Comeback Dog, illustrated by Troy Howell, Clarion (New York, NY), 1981.
- Courage at Indian Deep, Clarion (New York, NY), 1984.
- Wheels, illustrated by Emily McCully, Clarion (New York, NY), 1986.
- Fox in a Trap, illustrated by Troy Howell, Clarion (New York, NY), 1987.
- Saying Good-bye to Grandma, illustrated by Marcia Se-wall, Clarion (New York, NY), 1988.
- The Princess in the Pigpen, Clarion (New York, NY), 1989.
- Lights on the River, illustrated by Michael Dooling, Hyperion (New York, NY), 1994.
- Daddy Doesn't Have to Be a Giant Anymore, illustrated by Marcia Sewall, Clarion (New York, NY), 1996.
- Scaredy Dog, illustrated by Marilyn Mets, Hyperion (New York, NY), 1996.
- Behind the Mask: The Life of Elizabeth I, illustrated by Marcia Sewall, Clarion (New York, NY), 1996, published as Elizabeth the Great: Queen of the Golden Age, Houghton Mifflin (Boston, MA), 1996.
- Celebration!, illustrated by Raul Colon, Hyperion (New York, NY), 1997.
- The Snoop, illustrated by Ronald Himler, Clarion (New York, NY), 1999.
- The Counterfeit Princess, Clarion (New York, NY), 2005.
- Blind Mountain, Clarion (New York, NY), 2006.
