= This Town (TV series) =

2024 British television series

- Created by: Steven Knight
- Written by: Steven Knight
- Directed by: Paul Whittington
- Starring: Levi Brown; Jordan Bolger; Ben Rose; Eve Austin; Michelle Dockery; Geraldine James; Séainín Brennan; David Dawson; Nicholas Pinnock
- Country of origin: United Kingdom
- Original language: English
- No. of episodes: 6

Production
- Executive producers: Laura Conway; Martin Haines; Steven Knight; Jo McClellan; Katie McAleese; Matthew James Wilkinson; Karen Wilson; Nick Angel
- Producers: Tim Whitby; Charlotte Surtees
- Cinematography: Ben Wheeler
- Running time: 57 minutes
- Production companies: Kudos; Nebulastar; Mercury Studios; Stigma Films

Original release
- Network: BBC One
- Release: 31 March – 28 April 2024

This Town is a 2024 British six-part television series created and written for BBC One by Steven Knight and directed by Paul Whittington. The series follows a group of young people in the early 1980s in Birmingham and Coventry. The cast is led by Levi Brown, Jordan Bolger, Ben Rose, and Eve Austin. The series premiered on BBC One and BBC iPlayer on 31 March 2024. It won for Best Single Drama or Limited Series at the 2025 Royal Television Society Programme Awards.

== Synopsis ==
This Town tells the story of an extended family and four young people who are drawn into an explosive and iconic music scene in the early 1980s. It is set across the streets of Coventry and Birmingham, and opens with rioting in both places. This Town tells the story of a band's formation against a backdrop of violence.

== Cast and characters ==
- Levi Brown as Dante Williams
- Jordan Bolger as Gregory Williams
- Ben Rose as Bardon Quinn
- Eve Austin as Jeannie Keefe
- Michelle Dockery as Estella
- Nicholas Pinnock as Deuce Williams
- David Dawson as Robbie Carmen
- Geraldine James as Marie
- Séainín Brennan as Mrs Porter
- Peter McDonald as Eamonn
- Freya Parks as Fiona
- Shyvonne Ahmmad as Matty
- John Heffernan as Commander Bentley
- Stefan Asante-Boateng
- George Somner as Tyro
- Brendan Gibson

== Episodes ==
No.	Title	Directed by	Written by	Original release date
1	"Episode 1"	Paul Whittington	Steven Knight	31 March 2024
2	"Episode 2"	Paul Whittington	Steven Knight	31 March 2024
3	"Episode 3"	Paul Whittington	Steven Knight	31 March 2024
4	"Episode 4"	Paul Whittington	Steven Knight	31 March 2024
5	"Episode 5"	Paul Whittington	Steven Knight	31 March 2024
6	"Episode 6"	Paul Whittington	Steven Knight	31 March 2024

== Production ==
This Town was written and created for BBC One by Steven Knight and directed by Paul Whittington. It is produced by Kudos and Nebulastar and co-produced by Universal Music Group’s Mercury Studios.

=== Development ===
Knight and producer Nick Angel began working in November 2020 with the production companies Kudos and Stigma on a project set during the early 1980s UK music scene. A six-part series was commissioned by BBC One in April 2022.

For Knight, it is a project he has said is more personal work to him than his previous Birmingham based television series Peaky Blinders, with Knight describing This Town as his “love letter” to the area he grew up in and “an era I loved through and know well and [involving] characters who I feel I grew up with.”

=== Casting ===
Michelle Dockery, David Dawson and Nicholas Pinnock were announced to be cast in November 2022, it was also revealed that original music would be written specifically for the series by Dan Carey and Kae Tempest. That same month Séainín Brennan was added to the cast. Other main roles in the series are played by Levi Brown, Jordan Bolger, Ben Rose and Eve Austin.

=== Filming ===
Principal photography started in Birmingham in November 2022 on location in the city and at Knight’s Loc. Film and TV Studios. Filming locations also included Wolverhampton where a race riot was filmed. A casting call for extras to play skinheads was put in the local media and music press. In March 2023, filming took place in Burslem, Stoke-on-Trent.

=== Music ===
The series features music recorded for the programme from Sekou, Gregory Porter, Celeste, Olivia Dean, Ray Laurél, and Self Esteem, with each artist recording a cover version to play over the closing credits. It also features the original classic hits of artists such as UB40, the Specials, Toots and the Maytals, Blondie, Desmond Dekker & the Aces, the Clash, Siouxsie and the Banshees, and the Selecter.

The soundtrack also features original songs performed by the actors, with lyrics by poet Kae Tempest and music by Dan Carey. Carey also worked with the actors, who had varying levels of musical skills, to play the instruments and sing the songs as a band, eventually named Fuck the Factory.

On 26 April 2024 Polydor Records released This Town, an album of selected music from the soundtrack, on LP and CD.

== Broadcast ==
The series premiered on BBC One and BBC iPlayer on 31 March 2024.

== Reception ==
Hamish McBain in The Evening Standard wrote that the "period specific sets are perfect” but commented that the pacing of the series was slower than the trailer suggested. Carol Midgley writing for The Times awarded the first episode three stars out of five, writing that it is “sharp and the music is, as with most of Steven Knight’s dramas, expertly weaponised. But episode one was also meandering, slow and, dare I say it, often self-indulgent.”

The review aggregator website Rotten Tomatoes reported a 67% approval rating with an average rating of 6.5/10 based on 15 critic reviews. The website's critics consensus reads, "Steven Knight's This Town has a shapelessness that will sag some viewers' investment, but it holds intriguing insights into its specific cultural milieu."

== Accolades ==
The series won in the Single Drama or Limited Series category at the Royal Television Society Programme Awards in March 2025.
