= Tanya Reynolds =

English actress (born 1991)

- Reynolds in She Stoops to Conquer 2023
- Born: 4 November 1991 (age 35); Hemel Hempstead, Hertfordshire, England
- Occupation: Actress
- Years active: 2015–present

Tanya Reynolds (born 4 November 1991) is an English actress. On television, she is known for her roles in the Sky One series Delicious (2016–2019), the Netflix series Sex Education (2019–2023) and The Decameron (2024), the Channel 4 series I Hate You (2022), and the Apple TV series Ted Lasso (2026–present). Her films include Emma (2020). For her performance in the play A Mirror (2023) at Trafalgar Theatre, she received a Laurence Olivier Award nomination.

== Early life and education ==
Tanya Reynolds was born in Hemel Hempstead, Hertfordshire, in 1991. Her father was a builder and her mother was a sign writer. She is of half English and half Italian descent. Her first experience in acting was at the age of four in the school nativity.

Reynolds attended Royal Holloway, University of London and the Oxford School of Drama, after winning a fully funded scholarship which enabled her to afford the drama school fees. She graduated in 2015.

== Career ==
Reynolds first appeared on screen in several short films, including Civilised People by UK comedy duo In Cahoots, which was shown at the Edinburgh Festival Fringe in August 2015, The Jealous Boyfriend, also by In Cahoots, and Introducing Lucy. In 2016, Reynolds landed her first TV appearance playing Teresa Benelli for 12 episodes of Delicious.

2017 saw Reynolds furthering her TV career, with parts in Outlander, playing Lady Isobel Dunsany, and in the BBC thriller series Rellik, as 20 year old Sally. The same year she starred as Pearl Marston in the BBC crime drama Death in Paradise in the episode: "Murder from Above" shown in January 2018.

In 2018, Reynolds was a leading actor in the feature film Fanny Lye Deliver'd, among a cast that included Charles Dance and Maxine Peake. She also played a leading role as Teresa in the Sky One comedy Delicious, alongside a cast which included Iain Glen and Dawn French.

In 2019, she starred as Lily Iglehart in the Netflix comedy-drama Sex Education. Initially a recurring role for series 1, but she was promoted to a main character role for two further seasons. However, she did not return to the series for its fourth and final season.

In 2020, Reynolds played Mrs. Elton in a film adaptation of Jane Austen's Emma, alongside Anya Taylor-Joy and Bill Nighy. The same year, she was named as one of Screen International's Stars of Tomorrow 2020, which showcases talent within the television and film industry of Great Britain and Ireland. In 2021, Reynolds played Queen Victoria in the NBCUniversal series Dodger, alongside Christopher Eccleston as Fagin and David Threlfall as Chief of Police.

In 2023, she played lead role as Kate Hardcastle in She Stoops to Conquer by Oliver Goldsmith at the Orange Tree Theatre.

In 2024, Reynolds reprised the role of Mei in the West End transfer of A Mirror at the Trafalgar Theatre. For her performance, she was nominated for the Laurence Olivier Award for Best Actress in a Supporting Role. Later the same year, she appeared as Porcupine in the film Harold and the Purple Crayon.

She plays Caroline Bingley in the BBC One series The Other Bennet Sister, which premiered on 15 March 2026. Also in 2026, Reynolds plays Alice Chilton, a new assistant coach for a women's football team, in the fourth season of Ted Lasso, which premiered on 5 August 2026 on Apple TV.

== Filmography ==
Key
†	Denotes films that have not yet been released

=== Films ===
Year	Title	Role	Notes/Ref.
2015	The Jealous Boyfriend	Katie	Short film
2015	Civilised People	Francesca	Short film
2015	Introducing Lucy	Lucy	Short film
2018	Fanny Lye Deliver'd	Rebecca Henshaw	
2019	The Delivery	Jana Palmer	Short film
2019	For Love or Money	Alexa	
2019	Lily Meets Charlie	Lily	Short film
2019	Undergods	Maria	
2020	Emma	Mrs. Augusta Elton	
2021	X to X	Jeanie / Layla	Short film
2022	Everybody Dies... Sometimes	Mara	Short film
2024	Timestalker	Meg	
2024	Harold and the Purple Crayon	Porcupine	also voice
2025	The Actor	Multiple roles	

=== Television ===
Year	Title	Role	Notes	Ref.
2016–2019	Delicious	Teresa Benelli	Main (12 episodes)	
2017	Rellik	Sally	3 episodes	
2017	Outlander	Lady Isobel Dunsany	Episode: "Of Lost Things"	
2017	Death in Paradise	Pearl Marston	Episode: Murder from Above	
2018	The Bisexual	Jill	Episode: "1.5"	
2019	The Mallorca Files	Claire Taylor	Episode: "Honour Amongst Thieves"	
2019–2021	Sex Education	Lily Iglehart	22 episodes	
2020	Breeders	Therapist	Episode: 1.6: "No Taking"	
2022	Dodger	Queen Victoria	4 episodes	
2022	The Baby	Helen	3 episodes	
2022	I Hate You	Charlie	6 episodes	
2024	The Decameron	Licisca	8 episodes	
2026	Ted Lasso	Alice Chilton	Main (Season 4)	
2026	The Other Bennet Sister	Caroline Bingley	10-part series launched March 2026	

== Awards and nominations ==
Year	Award	Category	Nominated work	Result	Ref.
2020	Screen International	Stars of Tomorrow 2020		Won	
2021	Pena de Prata	Best Ensemble in a Comedy Series (shared)	Sex Education	Nominated	
2023	Kino London Short Film Festival	Best Performance in a Comedy	Everybody Dies... Sometimes	Won	
2024	Laurence Olivier Awards	Best Actress in a Supporting Role	A Mirror - Trafalgar Theatre	Nominated	
