= List of former Special Air Service personnel =

This list includes notable individuals who served in the Special Air Service (SAS) – regular and reserve.

- John Edward Almonds, known as "Jim Almonds"
- Michael Asher – author, historian and desert explorer
- Sir Peter de la Billière – Commander-in-Chief British Forces in the Gulf War
- Julian Brazier – MP for Canterbury
- Charles "Nish" Bruce – freefall expert
- Charles R. Burton – explorer
- "Big" Phil Campion – author
- Sir Mark Carleton-Smith – Chief of the General Staff (2018–2022)
- Frank Collins – first soldier to enter the building in the Iranian Embassy Siege
- Tim Collins – author
- James Condon – Indo-Malayan campaign casualty
- Jeffrey Cook – Director for Security Liaison in the Royal Household
- Johnny Cooper – the youngest founding member
- Cedric Delves – Lieutenant General
- Arthur Denaro – Major General
- Melvyn Downes – Sergeant Major, author of Unbreakable: The trailblazing SAS soldier who never backed down; directing staff in season 6 of SAS: Who Dares Wins
- Nick Downie – TV war correspondent
- Tim Evans – Commander of the Allied Rapid Reaction Corps (2013–2016)
- David Eyton-Jones
- Sir Ranulph Fiennes – adventurer
- John Paul Foley – former director of intelligence
- Terry Forrestal – stuntman
- Anthony Greville-Bell – scriptwriter and sculptor
- Taff Groves – key rescuer in the Westgate shopping mall attack
- Bear Grylls – television host, and the youngest Briton to climb Mount Everest
- Gavin Hamilton
- Jon Hollingsworth
- Talaiasi "Laba" Labalaba – Battle of Mirbat participant
- Michael Patrick "Bronco" Lane – author and mountaineer
- Lofty Large – author
- Jock Lewes – co-founder of the regiment
- Jamie Lowther-Pinkerton – Private Secretary to Prince William and Prince Harry
- Fitzroy Maclean – author and MP for Bute and Northern Ayrshire and Lancaster
- Simon Mann – mercenary
- Sir Carol Mather – MP for Esher
- Paddy Mayne – British and Irish Lions rugby union player
- John McAleese – first man on the balcony during the Iranian Embassy siege in 1980 caught on live news. Team member for the BBC Television series SAS Survival Secrets
- Peter McAleese – former mercenary and author
- Eoin McGonigal – founding member
- Andy McNab – author
- Danny Nightingale
- Peter Oldfield – cricketer
- Bob Parr – Emmy Award-winning TV producer, academic and author
- Lewis Pugh – environmental campaigner and swimmer
- Peter Ratcliffe – author
- Ronald Reid-Daly – Selous Scouts founder
- John Ridgway – record-breaking sailor
- Anthony Royle, Baron Fanshawe of Richmond – former MP
- Chris Ryan – author
- Mike Sadler – longest surviving original member and former member of the LRDG
- Reginald Seekings – founding member
- Bill Kennedy Shaw – intelligence officer during World War II
- Oliver Shepard – explorer
- Al Slater
- John Slim, 2nd Viscount Slim
- Phil Stant – professional footballer
- David Stirling – founder of the Regiment
- Wilfred Thesiger – explorer and writer
- Tip Tipping – stuntman
- Richard Tomlinson – Secret Intelligence Service officer
- John Tonkin
- Steve Truglia – stuntman
- Sir Roland Walker – Chief of the General Staff (2024–present)
- Ian "Chalky" White – Operation Nimrod participant
- John "Lofty" Wiseman (Regimental Sergeant Major)
- Johnny Wiseman – World War II participant
- John Woodhouse – commander and founder of the SAS's modern selection system
