= Tomos Mansel Stephens =

British Army officer

- Born: 31 May 1920; Llansteffan, Carmarthenshire, Wales
- Died: July 7, 1944 (aged 24); Verrières, France
- Military career
- Allegiance: United Kingdom
- Branch: British Army
- Rank: Lieutenant
- Nickname: "Twm"
- Units: South Wales Borderers; Commandos; 1st SAS Regiment
- Conflicts: World War II; Operation Bulbasket

Tomos Mansel "Twm" Stephens (31 May 1920 – 7 July 1944) was a Welsh officer of the Special Air Service (SAS) during World War II. He is best known for his role in Operation Bulbasket, a sabotage mission behind enemy lines in Vienne, France, following the Normandy landings.

== Early life ==
Stephens was born on 31 May 1920, in Llansteffan, Carmarthenshire, Wales. A native Welsh speaker, he was often called "Twm" (the Welsh equivalent of Tom) by his comrades in the SAS.

== Military service ==
Stephens initially enlisted in the South Wales Borderers before volunteering for the Commandos. He later joined "B" Squadron of the newly formed 1st Regiment of the Special Air Service (1 SAS).

=== Operation Bulbasket ===
On the night of 6 June 1944 (D-Day), Stephens parachuted into the Vienne region of France as part of a 45-man SAS team.

On 10 June 1944, he performed a critical reconnaissance mission. Disguised as a young French farmer and riding a bicycle, he completed a 120-kilometre (75-mile) round trip to the railway sidings at Châtellerault. He successfully confirmed the location of eleven petrol tankers destined for the 2nd SS Panzer Division Das Reich. His report led to a Royal Air Force Mosquito bombing raid the next day, which destroyed the fuel and significantly delayed German reinforcements reaching the Normandy front.

== Capture and death ==
On 3 July 1944, the secret SAS base in the Forêt de Verrières was discovered and surrounded by approximately 400 German troops. During the battle, Stephens was wounded and captured while reportedly attempting to cover the escape of a young French resistance fighter.

In violation of the Geneva Convention, and acting under Hitler's Commando Order, a German officer bludgeoned Stephens to death with a rifle butt on 7 July 1944. He was 24 years old. While 30 of his fellow SAS prisoners were executed by firing squad in the nearby woods of St. Sauvant, Stephens was buried separately in the village of Verrières.

== See also ==
- Operation Bulbasket
- Special Air Service
