= Savile Row Eyewear =

English designer brand

- Founded: 1988
- Founder: Max Wiseman & Co
- Owner: Inspecs
- Website: savileroweyewear.com

Savile Row Eyewear is an eyewear brand produced since 1988 at the Algha Works factory. Algha was established in London in 1898 by Max Wiseman & Co. Manufacturing was then moved to East London from Germany in 1932. From the 1950s until 1988 Algha produced subsidised eyewear under the NHS. Eyewear designed and manufactured at the Algha Works factory has enjoyed a cult status in eye wear history and has been worn by numerous public figures.

== History ==
The English Algha company was established by Max Wiseman & Co. in 1932. Due to post-war inflation in Germany in 1932, Max Wiseman asked his sons to move manufacturing to East London thereby establishing the Algha Works factory. The equipment and workers were moved to London from a factory in Rathenow, Havelland in Brandenburg, Germany. The Algha factory manufactured rolled-gold metal eye wear frames.

Max Wiseman's son who directed and founded Algha Works was Johnny Wiseman, a veteran of the British SAS. The name ‘Algha’ represents the merging of two Greek letters, alpha and omega, literally meaning the beginning and the end.

During the Second World War Algha manufactured Aviator spectacles for pilots along with eye wear for gas masks, both of which were used by the British Armed Forces throughout the war.

In the 1950s Algha was transformed into a household name when it was tendered to produce glasses for the NHS, which it did for more than 40 years. During its heyday, up to half a million frames annually were produced in the three-story building by its 200-plus staff.

In 2012 Algha works was fully integrated by Inspecs Ltd.

=== Savile Row Eyewear ===
With the deregulation of the British eyewear industry by Margaret Thatcher’s government Algha reinvented itself as a private eyewear brand. In 1988 ‘Savile Row Eye Wear’ was established.

In 2022, the company was forced to move out of its Fish Island location where it was based since 1932.

== Manufacturing ==
With the creation of Algha Works, Max Wiseman aimed to innovate the design of eyeglasses and to make gold-filling the standard for eye wear. Using rolled gold in frames gave the advantage of preventing rusting and wear.

Max Wiseman & Co produced numerous patents relating to eye wear design.

The original factory and machinery used by Wiseman & Co in 1932 are used to produce frames to this day.

== In popular culture ==
Glasses made at the factory have been worn in many films:

- Lolita by Sue Lyon
- Harrison Ford and Sean Connery in the Indiana Jones films
- Monty Python
- Malcolm X by Denzel Washington
- The Harry Potter series
- The Ninth Gate by Johnny Depp

Eyewear produced at Algha has also been worn by various public figures including Ozzy Osbourne, John Lennon, Eric Clapton, Rihanna and Queen Elizabeth II.
