= James Paxton (actor) =

American actor (born 1994)

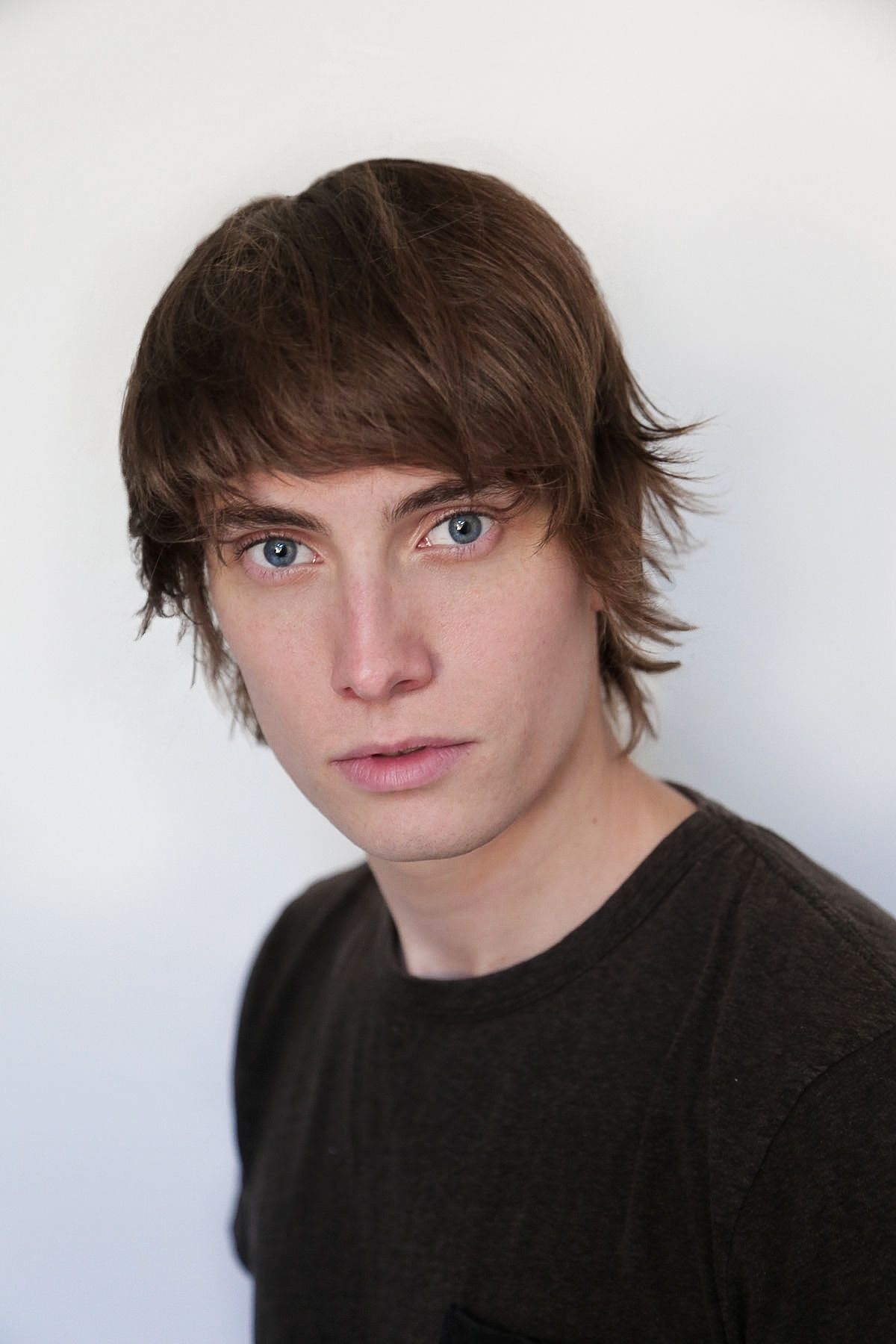
- Paxton in 2018
- Born: February 23, 1994 (age 32); Ojai, California, U.S.
- Occupation: Actor
- Years active: 2003–present
- Parent(s): Bill Paxton; Louise Paxton

James Paxton (born February 23, 1994) is an American actor. He is best known for his role as Lukas Waldenbeck in the crime thriller drama series Eyewitness (2016).

== Early life ==
James Paxton is the son of actor Bill Paxton and Louise Paxton. He went to college to study journalism but left in order to pursue a career in the film industry, initially working in the props department on Dan Gilroy's film Nightcrawler in 2013.

== Career ==
In 2016, he co-starred in the USA Network drama series Eyewitness as Lukas Waldenbeck. In 2019, he played MacWhirr and a Xenomorph in the short films Alien Containment and Alien Alone, set in the Alien franchise his father had previously starred in. In 2020, he played a younger version of his father's character John Garrett in Agents of S.H.I.E.L.D.

In 2024, Paxton made a cameo appearance in Twisters, in honor of his late father who had starred in the prior installment in the franchise. Of that decision, he stated: "I wanted to do something that really honors his presence in this new chapter and really do something for him. And I realized there's a lot of amazing people involved in this that I would love to get to know. And so it ended up feeling like the right thing to do, to be representative of Dad there." Additionally, Paxton released his first song "Count on Me", which he wrote and provided vocals for.

Paxton co-starred opposite Malcolm McDowell in Last Train to Fortune, directed by Adam Rifkin. His late father was previously attached to Paxton's role when the film was in development in the 1990s.

== Personal life ==
His father, Bill Paxton, died in 2017.

== Filmography ==
=== Film ===
Year	Title	Role	Notes
2003	Spy Kids 3-D: Game Over	'Dinky' Winks Jr.	Cameo
2005	The Greatest Game Ever Played	Young Harry Vardon	
2016	Term Life	Adam	
2017	Roman J. Israel, Esq.	Henry	Uncredited
2017	An American in Texas	Chad Hill	
2018	Boogeyman Pop	Tony	
2019	Velvet Buzzsaw	Bartender	
2019	First Person: A Film About Love	Intern Darren	
2019	Low Tide	Nate	
2019	Bit	Mark	
2019	The Fanatic	'Slim'	
2020	Teenage Badass	Shan	
2021	The Cleaner	James	
2022	The Uncanny	Dennis	
2024	Twisters	Cody	Cameo
2025	DRAGN	Tom Wilson	
2025	Last Train to Fortune	Jedidiah Dooley	

=== Television ===
Year	Title	Role	Notes
2015	Texas Rising	Roy	Miniseries; 2 episodes
2016	Eyewitness	Lukas Waldenbeck	Main cast; 10 episodes
2017	Training Day	Bobby Hollister	Episode: "Blurred Lines"
2019	The One Minute Joe Show	James	Episode: "Knock-Knock"
2019	Mr. Mom	Daniel	Episode: "Sick Day"
2020	Agents of S.H.I.E.L.D.	John Garrett	3 episodes

=== Music videos ===
Music
Year	Music video	Role	Artist(s)
2019	"Beggar's Song"	The Kid	Matt Maeson
2019	"I Just Don't Care That Much"	The Kid	Matt Maeson

=== Short films ===
Short film
Year	Title	Role	Notes
2013	The Playful Coach	Cheering Spectator #1	
2017	Penny Sucker	Clint	
2019	The Orchard Girl	James	
2019	Alien Containment	MacWhirr (Man On Radio)	Voice
2019	Alien Alone	MacWhirr Xenomorph	
2019	The Diamond Girls	Carly	
2020	All-In	Clyde	
