= Theo Barklem-Biggs =

English actor (born 1990)

- Born: 21 March 1990 (age 36); Westminster, London, England
- Occupation: Actor
- Years active: 2008–present
- Known for: Silk, Sliced, The First Team, SAS: Rogue Heroes

Theo Barklem-Biggs (born 21 March 1990) is an English television and film actor from London. He has performed both comedic and dramatic roles.

== Career ==
He made his debut television appearance in The Bill in 2008. He appeared in EastEnders, Silk, The Fades on British television and then in the 2011 film The Inbetweeners, and the 2014 film Kingsman: The Secret Service. In May 2020, he began playing Petey in The First Team, playing a young player at a Premier League football club. On the show he appeared with his close friend Samson Kayo with whom he had also appeared in Sliced as two best friends and pizza delivery drivers. Kayo wrote the part specifically for Barklem-Biggs who he had known for 10 or more years.

Barklem-Biggs received praise for his performance as Sid Godley in the 2014 World War One drama Our World War. He had the main role in the BAFTA nominated short-film Samuel-613. He appeared in the British TV series Cleaning Up alongside Sheridan Smith and the comedy prison series Crims alongside Elis James. He also appeared in the BBC series Tatau, and the 2018 comedy film The Festival. He was "unsettling" in the 2019 Claire Oakley film Make Up, and was "effectively creepy" in the 2021 British horror film The Power.

In 2022, he starred in SAS: Rogue Heroes alongside Connor Swindells, Jack O'Connell, Alfie Allen and Dominic West from Peaky Blinders creator Steven Knight. He returned for the second series in 2025 and later that year, he was confirmed as returning for the third series. That year, he could be seen in Christmas family comedy television film Stuffed alongside Guz Khan and Morgana Robinson.

== Filmography ==
=== Film ===
Year	Title	Role	Notes
2011	Age of Heroes	Soldier 2	
2011	The Inbetweeners	Richard	
2011	7 Lives	Kid	
2012	The Man Inside	Karl Lee	
2012	Hives	Lee	Segment: "London"
2012	Keith Lemon: The Film	Buster (Hoodie)	
2013	Hammer of the Gods	Vali	
2014	Kingsman: The Secret Service	Ryan	
2017	Pound for Pound	Dave Boy Green	
2017	Journey's End	Private Watson	
2018	Hunter Killer	Seaman Mackinnon	Uncredited
2018	The Festival	Gordy	
2018	Farming	Scum	
2018	Bloodyminded	Sid Varney	
2019	Alien Containment	Nass	Short film
2019	Make Up	Kai	
2020	The Forgotten Battle	John	
2021	Cherry	Sgt. North	
2021	The Power	Neville	
2023	The End We Start From	L	

=== Television ===
Year	Title	Role	Notes
2008	The Bill	Carl	Episode: "Fools Rush In"
2009	Moses Jones	Young White Boy	Episode #1.1
2009	Missing	Anthony Taylor	Episode: "Flip the Coin"
2009	Doctors	Anthony	Episode: "Art of War"
2009	How Not to Live Your Life	Lad on Bus	Episode: "Don Goes Gay"
2009	Micro Men	Sinclair Journalist	Television film
2010	Survivors	Jordan	Episode #2.5
2010	Holby City	Joey	Episode: "Fool's Gold"
2010	Coming Up	Parker	Episode: "Dip"
2010	Some Dogs Bite	Mick (uncredited)	Television film
2010	New Tricks	Shane Evens	Episode: "Good Morning Lemmings"
2010	EastEnders	Mitch Gannon	6 episodes
2010	Law & Order: UK	Charlie Blake	Episode: "Help"
2010	Miranda	Youth	Episode: "A New Low"
2011	Silent Witness	Joseph Ryland	2 episodes
2011	The Fades	DC Firth	5 episodes
2011–2014	Silk	Jake Milner	18 episodes
2012	A Touch of Cloth	Darren Crossway	2 episodes
2013	Count Arthur Strong	Antony	Episode: "Arthur's Big Moment"
2013	The Guilty	Jason Byrne	2 episodes
2013	Homeboys	Alan	Television film
2014	Alt	Terry	Television film
2014	Our World War	Sidney Godley	Episode: "The First Day"
2014	Kerry	Dale	Television film
2015	Crims	Marcel	6 episodes
2015	Ballot Monkeys	Conor Jones	5 episodes
2015	Tatau	Pete 'Budgie' Griffiths	8 episodes
2015	The Interceptor	Buster	Episode #1.2
2015	Cradle to Grave	Colin	Episode #1.1
2016–2017	Drunk History: UK	Leslie Walkington / Guy Gibson	3 episodes
2018	Death in Paradise	Ray Campbell	Episode: "The Stakes Are High"
2019	Cleaning Up	Chris	5 episodes
2019	Timewasters	Len White	2 episodes
2019	White Gold	Ronnie Jnr.	4 episodes
2019	Carnival Row	Cabal	3 episodes
2019–2021	Sliced	Ricky	9 episodes
2020	The First Team	Petey	6 episodes
2022–	SAS: Rogue Heroes	Reg Seekings	11 episodes
2025	Stuffed	Jamie	TV Film
