= Jack Barton (actor) =

English actor (born 1995)

- Born: United Kingdom
- Education: Oxford School of Drama
- Occupation: Actor
- Years active: 2020-present
- Television: Heartstopper; SAS: Rogue Heroes

Jack Barton is an English actor. His television appearances include Heartstopper (2023–2026) and SAS: Rogue Heroes (2025).

== Career ==
He attended the Oxford School of Drama, graduating in 2018. He played Foldo in television series The Letter for the King in 2020. He had a breakout role as David Nelson in the Netflix coming-of-age romance series Heartstopper. He had a small part in Yorgos Lanthimos’s film Poor Things. He also had roles in War of the Worlds, The Pursuit of Love and Grantchester.

In 2024, he played his first voice-acting role in a video game, voicing the boss Messmer the Impaler in the Elden Ring expansion Shadow of the Erdtree.

He played real-life SAS soldier John Tonkin in series two of Steven Knight World War Two set drama SAS: Rogue Heroes for BBC One in 2025. In preparation for the role, he read Ben Macintyre's book on the SAS and was able to speak to Tonkin's daughter, Jane, who was living in Australia. Later that year, he was confirmed as returning for the third series.

== Filmography ==
Year	Title	Role	Notes
2020	The Letter for the King	Foldo	6 episodes
2020	Grantchester	Chris	1 episode
2021	The Pursuit of Love	Angelic man	2 episodes
2022	War of the Worlds	Hiram	6 episodes
2023	Poor Things	Fop	Film
2023–2024	Heartstopper	David Nelson	5 episodes
2025	SAS: Rogue Heroes	John Tonkin	6 episodes
2025	Talamasca: The Secret Order	Osterhaus	3 episodes
2026	Heartstopper Forever	David Nelson	Television film

=== Video games ===
Year	Title	Role	Notes
2024	Elden Ring	Messmer the Impaler	Shadow of the Erdtree expansion
