= César Domboy =

French actor (born 1990)

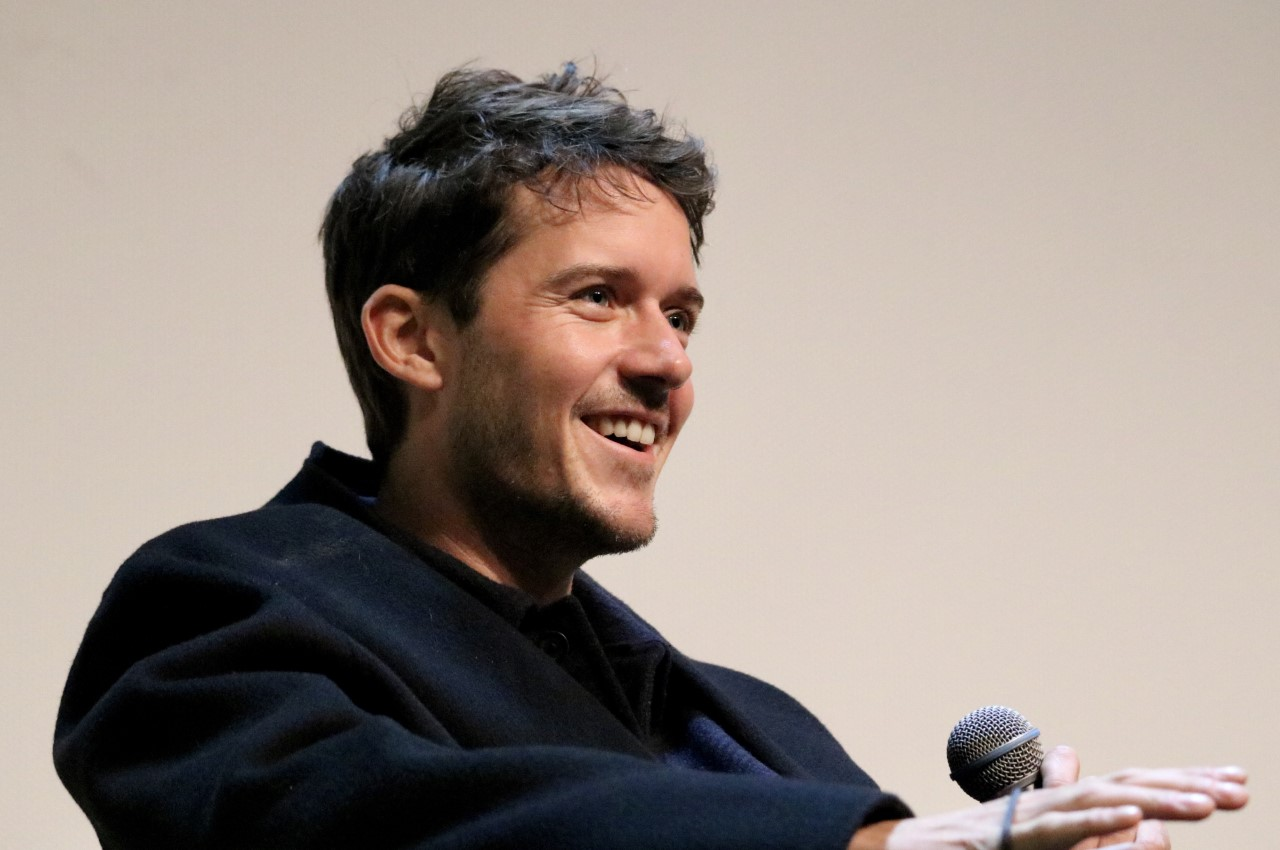
- César Domboy in 2019
- Born: César Domboy; 10 March 1990 (age 36); Paris, France
- Occupation: Actor
- Years active: 2004–present

César Domboy (French: [sezaʁ dɔ̃bwa]; born 10 March 1990) is a French actor best known for his role as Fergus Claudel Fraser in the Starz television drama Outlander.

== Early life ==
Domboy was born on 10 March 1990 in France, the middle of three children born to his family. He did not attend formal drama school; instead he received private lessons from actress and drama coach Laurence Le Dantec, who has taught theatre for more than fifteen years. In addition to Domboy, her students include Nils Hugon and Gaspard Ulliel.

== Career ==
Domboy's first professional role, at age fourteen in 2004, was director Étienne Chatiliez's feature-length comedy Just Trust (La Confiance Règne), opposite Vincent Lindon. The next year, he was featured in France 3's made-for-TV film Let's Go Small Children (Allons Petits Enfants), a war drama which centered on a young boy who was attempting to restore his family's honor after his father deserted. Raspail Production's thriller Red Needles (Les Aiguilles Rouges), about a group of boys lost on a hike near Brévent Lake, saw Domboy in the role of Guy. His next role was as Ferdinand in an episode of France 2's television mini-series The Pasquier Clan (Le Clan Pasquier), a family drama set against the backdrop of early Twentieth Century France. From there he returned to feature films in François Desagnat's 2008 adaptation of Vincent Ravalec's novel Daddy Cool (15 Ans et Demi).

In 2009, Domboy starred in Canal+'s Écrire Pour un Chanteur in an episode entitled "Three Celestial Bodies (Les Astres Noirs)", opposite Julien Doré and Paul Schmitt. His next film, Bus Palladium, a dramatic comedy from director Christopher Thompson, featured Domboy as a member of the band Lust as they pursued their musical aspirations. That same year saw him feature in Bertrand Tavernier's drama The Princess of Montpensier, an adaptation of Madame de Lafayette's 1622 novella of the same name.

Domboy went on to star as 'Piano' in director Michaël Dacheux's 2011 film On the Go (Sur le Départ), a drama revolving around the lives of two young men who meet in their hometown regularly while their lives distance them from each other. In the series five episode "Vue sur Internet" of France 3's dramatic comedy Famille D'accueil(2012), Domboy portrayed guest character Stan. That same year he featured in the YouTube mini-series En Passant Pécho and starred as Guy de Laval in series two of the TV series Borgia, opposite Mark Ryder. He also featured in Bénédicte Pagnot's political activism based film Les Lendemains and Stefan Liberski's feature length dramatic comedy Baby Balloon. In 2014, Domboy co-starred in Week-ends, a drama based on the lives of two couples as told through what occurred during their weekends. He was then cast as The Kid in TF1's drama Résistance, which was loosely based on the activities of the Groupe du musée de l'Homme, which operated as part of the French Resistance in World War II.

2015 saw Domboy star in Les Invisibles, a short film that followed a young man as he started work in the nuclear industry among the "invisible" workers. He finished out the year by co-starring in director Robert Zemeckis' feature film The Walk, based upon the real-life story of Philippe Petit's high wire walk between the World Trade Center towers. He next featured in the romantic comedy Up For Love (Un Homme À La Hauteur) and director Christian Duguay's A Bag of Marbles (Un Sac de Billes), the story of two Jewish boys caught in occupied France during World War II. In 2017, Domboy debuted in the recurring role of Fergus Claudel Fraser, opposite Lauren Lyle's Marsali MacKimmie Fraser, in Starz's hit time travel drama Outlander, based upon Diana Gabaldon's best-selling book series of the same name.

Domboy was seen in two feature films in 2021, as Charles Grandet in Eugénie Grandet, based upon the novel of the same name by Honoré de Balzac, and Ernest in The Mad Women's Ball (Le Bal des folles), based upon the novel by Victoria Mas. In 2022 he joined the cast of BBC's series SAS: Rogue Heroes as Augustin Jordan, in a six-part drama based upon Ben Macintyre's book of the same name.

== Filmography ==
=== Television ===
Year	Title	Character	Production	Notes
2005	Let's Go Small Children (Allons Petits Enfants)	Pierrot	France 3	Television film
2007	The Pasquier Clan (Le Clan Pasquier)	Ferdinand	France 2	Miniseries, 1 episode
2009	Écrire Pour un Chanteur	Nathan	Canal+	Episode: "Les Astres Noirs"
2011	E-Love	Aurélien	TV5	Television film
2012	Famille D'accueil	Stan	France 3	Episode: "Vue sur Internet"
2013	En Passant Pécho	Le Maton	YouTube	Episode: "Carotte Cellule"
2013	The Borgias	Guy de Leval	Bravo/Showtime'	4 episodes
2014	Résistance	The Kid	TF1	Miniseries, 3 episodes
2017–2026	Outlander	Fergus Claudel Fraser	Starz	Main role, 26 episodes
2021	SAS: Rogue Heroes	Augustin Jordan	BBC	
2024	Culte	Raphaël Dumas	Amazon Prime	Main role, 6 episodes

=== Film ===
Year	Title	Character	Notes
2004	Just Trust (La Confiance Règne)	Benjamin Finkel	
2006	Red Needles (Les Aiguilles Rouges)	Guy	
2008	Daddy Cool (15 Ans et Demi)	Achille	
2010	Bus Palladium	Boris	
2010	The Princess of Montpensier	Charles, Duke of Mayenne	
2011	On the Go (Sur le Départ)	Piano	lead in 50-minute film
2013	Les Lendemains	Thibault	
2013	Baby Balloon	Vince	
2014	Week-ends	Julien	
2015	Les Invisibles	Alexandre	Short film
2015	The Walk	Jeff / Jean-François	Based upon the true story of high wire artist Philippe Petit.
2016	Up For Love (Un Homme À La Hauteur)	Benji	
2017	A Bag of Marbles (Un Sac de Billes)	Henri Joffo	
2021	Eugénie Grandet	Charles Grandet	Based upon the novel of the same name by Honoré de Balzac.
2021	The Mad Women's Ball (Le Bal des folles)	Ernest	Based upon the novel Le Bal des folles, by Victoria Mas.
2022	No Limit (Sous emprise)	Tom	
2024	Rich Flu (La fiebre de los ricos)	Christian	
