= Lewes bomb =

British blast-incendiary field expedient explosive device

The Lewes bomb was a blast-incendiary field expedient explosive device, manufactured by mixing diesel oil, Thermite and Nobel 808 plastic explosive. It was created by Lieutenant Jock Lewes, one of the original members of L Detachment SAS in 1941.

== History ==
The SAS needed a combined incendiary and explosive device light enough to be carried by a small group of commandos yet powerful enough to destroy and set fire to aircraft on an enemy airfield. Weighing approximately 1 pound (0.45 kg), the Lewes bomb could be carried in quantity by an individual.

The only available bomb at the time was too cumbersome to be carried by a paratrooper. Lewes experimented with various types of incendiary and explosive materials, using trial and error. The final design used 1 pound (450 g) of plastic explosive, mixed with a 1/4 pound (110 g) of thermite and a small amount of diesel oil and steel filings. Inside the mass was inserted a two-ounce (60 g) dry guncotton booster, plus a detonator attached to a thirty seconds fuse. Alternatively, Lewes bombs could be triggered by pencil detonators or booby-trap firing devices such as pressure release switches. It is not clear what was used as a container for the explosive, though it was probably a small canvas bag of some sort. In use, the device was placed inside the cockpit or on the wing of an aircraft in order to ignite the aviation fuel stored within.

A disadvantage of the Lewes bomb was that the detonators could be unreliable; several raids failed when their pencil-detonators were rendered unusable by heavy rain. The timing of the detonators could also be affected by the desert heat; after a raid in December 1941 one party reported the 30-minute time pencils had detonated in just 18 minutes due to the warmth of the night.

In the hands of the SAS the Lewes bomb was an effective weapon against parked aircraft; following an attack in December 1941, an assessment was carried out by a group of Italian engineers on some unexploded bombs found on aircraft at their airfield. After repairing the fuses, they placed the bombs "with school-boy enthusiasm" on some old aircraft, exactly as they had been found. The result, they reported, was that "in every case the firing of the charge, besides causing considerable damage due to the explosion, set the fuel alight... causing complete destruction of the vehicle". However they also noted that the fires did not "seem to have been due to any particular qualities of the explosive, but to the accurate placing of the charges in proximity to the fuel tanks"

== Sources ==
- Lewes, John (2001). Jock Lewes: The Biography of Jock Lewes, Co-founder of the SAS. Pen & Sword Books Ltd. ISBN 0-85052-805-4.
- Gavin Mortimer (2011) The SAS in World War II: Osprey Publishing ISBN 978 1 84908 646 2
- Reese, Peter (1999). The Scottish Commander. Canongate Books. ISBN 0-86241-833-X.
