= Augustin Jordan =

French diplomat (1910–2004)

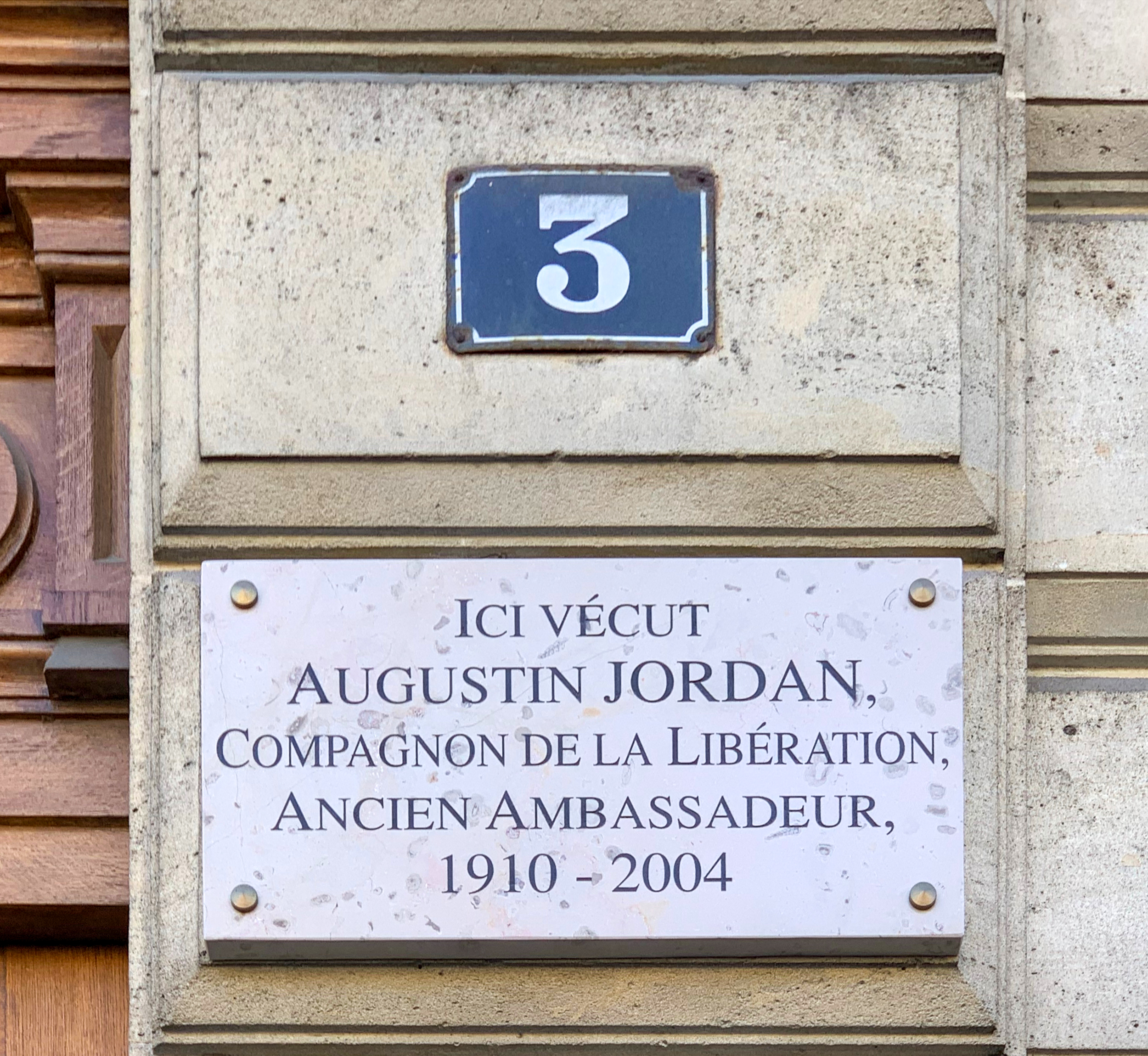
- Memorial to Jordan located to Place d’Iéna in Paris

French Ambassador to Poland
- In office 1970–1973
- President: Georges Pompidou
- Preceded by: Arnaud Wapler
- Succeeded by: Louis Dauge

French Ambassador to Austria
- In office 1973–1975
- President: Georges Pompidou
- Preceded by: Francois Leduc
- Succeeded by: Georges Gaucher

Personal details
- Born: 10 December 1910 Paris, France
- Died: 24 March 2004 (aged 93) Saint-Léger-sous-Beuvray, France
- Education: Sciences Po
- Occupation: Ambassador
- Profession: Diplomat, Soldier
- Awards: Commander of the Légion d'honneur Companion of the Liberation; Croix de Guerre with four palms Resistance Medal with rosette Military Cross (UK); Order of Merit of the Federal Republic of Germany (DE)

Military service
- Allegiance: Free France; France
- Branch/service: French Airborne
- Years of service: 1931–1932; 1939–1945
- Rank: Commandant (1945)
- Battles/wars: World War II

Augustin Marie Camille Jordan (10 December 1910 – 24 March 2004) was a French soldier and diplomat who served as one of the founding members of the French Special Air Service during World War Two, for which he was awarded the Legion of Honour and Order of Liberation.

After the war, he joined the Ministry for Foreign Affairs and became a diplomat who served as the French ambassador to Poland and Austria.

== Early life and studies ==
Born in Paris in 1910, Jordan graduated from the Free School of Political Sciences with a degree in literature and law before becoming an associate of Louis Joxe at the Center for Foreign Policy Studies and of future fellow Resistance hero Pierre Brossolette at the weekly review L'Europe nouvelle from 1934 to 1937. He then became the secretary general of the Central Committee of Industrialists of Morocco.

== Start of World War Two ==
Already a cavalry veteran thanks to his military service with the 4th Dragoons in 1931 and in Morocco when the war broke out in 1939, Jordan was initially mobilised into light-cavalry regiment the 2nd Spahis. However, he soon defected to the Free French Forces of General de Gaulle.

Until early 1941, he worked in the Free French civil services in Carlton Gardens in London, where with Joseph Hackin and Pierre-Olivier Lapie, he worked on the development of the first Free French committees in support of the actions of General de Gaulle.

Wanting a combat assignment, Jordan joined 2nd Office of the General Staff of the 1st FFL Brigade in May 1941, and was placed under the command of Major General Paul Legentilhomme. He participated in the Syrian campaign in June 1941.

== With the SAS ==
In 1942 Jordan became a founding member of L Detachment, Special Air Service, participating in their operations in North Africa.

In June 1942 following the capture of Georges Bergé, Jordan was promoted to captain and given command of the newly-renamed C Squadron of 1 SAS. Jordan himself was lucky to avoid capture the same month during a raid alongside the Special Interrogation Group on Derna airfield.

He subsequently commanded a contingent of French SAS during the highly successful Raid on Sidi Haneish Airfield.

Jordan was recommended for a Distinguished Service Order by SAS founder David Stirling that was downgraded to a Military Cross.

Jordan was captured on January 27, 1943 during a raid behind General Erwin Rommel's supply lines in Tunisia. Awarded a Companion of the Liberation on March 26, 1943, he spent the rest of the war as a prisoner of war in German custody, eventually ending up imprisoned in Colditz Castle alongside Stirling and Bergé.

== Post-war diplomatic career ==
Released from German imprisonment in April 1945, he entered French diplomatic service at the Quai d'Orsay in October. Initially serving posts in Athens and Bonn, in 1954 he became chief of staff to Minister for Moroccan and Tunisian Affairs Christian Fouchet under the presidency of Pierre Mendès France. Promoted the following year to the position of director of the central administration of the Ministry of Foreign Affairs, Jordan was appointed ambassador to Poland in 1970 and Austria in 1973.

== In popular culture ==
Jordan was portrayed by French actor César Domboy in BBC series SAS: Rogue Heroes, a six part drama based upon Ben Macintyre's book of the same name.
