= Dónal Finn =

Irish actor (born 1995)

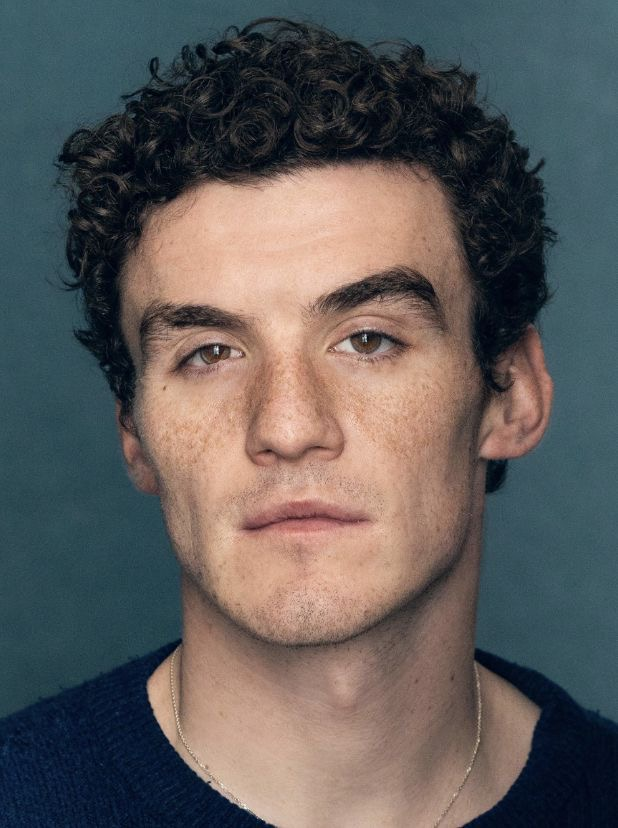
- Finn in 2023
- Born: 31 August 1995 (age 31); Dromina, County Cork, Ireland
- Education: London Academy of Music and Dramatic Art
- Occupation: Actor
- Known for: Hadestown (West End, 2024); Young Sherlock; The Other Bennet Sister

Dónal Finn (born 31 August 1995) is an Irish actor. On television, he is known for his roles in the Amazon Prime series The Wheel of Time (2023–2025) and Young Sherlock (2026), and the BBC One series The Other Bennet Sister (2026). He originated the role of Orpheus in the West End production of Hadestown.

== Early life and education ==
Finn was born and raised in Dromina, County Cork, Ireland. He is one of eight children from a farming family. Music was a big part of his family growing up, as he recalled in an interview: "there was always music in our house. I suppose it’s like a part of the family tradition as well. For family gatherings, as the night rolls on people do start to sing. So the notion of singing in front of other people I always saw as a kid."

As a child, Finn was first introduced to the stage through being part of his school's musical production of Aladdin. This inspired him to join drama clubs and youth theatres in nearby Castlemagner, Mallow, and Fermoy. He went on to perform in local productions of plays, pantos, and musicals, notably Fame in 2009 and Little Shop of Horrors in 2011. He starred as Seymour in the latter, receiving praises for "mastering the melody and harmonies of what is considered very difficult music". Finn was a pupil at Scoil Mhuire in Kanturk, where he also took up public speaking. He and his school friends won County Cork Mental Health Foundation's public speaking competition in 2012.

After leaving school, Finn worked for a year in a supermarket to save up for auditions and application fees for drama schools. In 2015, he was awarded a three-year scholarship at the London Academy of Music and Dramatic Art (LAMDA) through the Overstall Charitable Trust. He graduated with a Bachelor of Arts in acting from LAMDA in 2018.

== Career ==
After graduating from LAMDA, Finn made his first notable appearance in an episode of the Netflix series The Witcher as a peasant named Nettly in 2019.

Finn also had a small role as a baker named Albert in Fantastic Beasts: The Secrets of Dumbledore.

In 2022, Finn was cast in the role of soldier Eoin McGonigal in the first series of the BBC drama SAS: Rogue Heroes. That same year, he was cast as Mat Cauthon in the second season of The Wheel of Time, succeeding Barney Harris in the role.

In 2023, he was named one of the inaugural "Rising Stars of Ireland" by Screen International and Screen Ireland.

In February 2024, Finn played the role of Orpheus in the West End production of Hadestown. Finn left the production on 25 August 2024. He was featured in the cast recording album Hadestown: Live from London, released in December 2024.

In July 2024, it was announced Finn would appear as a young incarnation of James Moriarty alongside Hero Fiennes Tiffin's Sherlock Holmes in the 2026 Amazon Prime Video series Young Sherlock. He has received critical acclaim for his performance as Moriarty, with the character being cited as the show's breakout character.

In March 2026, Finn starred as Mr. Hayward in The Other Bennet Sister. He also appeared in a small role in The Uprising released in cinemas in September 2026.

== Personal life ==
Finn currently lives in London and is close friends with fellow Irish actors Chris Walley, Éanna Hardwicke, and Frank Blake.

== Filmography ==
Film

Year	Title	Role	Notes
2018	Angel	Killian	LAMDA short film
2019	How to Build a Girl	Karl Boden	
2022	Fantastic Beasts: The Secrets of Dumbledore	Albert	
2025	Four Letters of Love	Sean Gore	
2026	The Uprising	The Priest	

Television

Year	Title	Role	Notes
2019	The Witcher	Nettly	Episode: "Four Marks"
2020	Cursed	Kurt	Episode: "Cursed"
2022–2025	SAS: Rogue Heroes	Eoin McGonigal	4 episodes
2023–2025	The Wheel of Time	Mat Cauthon	Main role
2026	Young Sherlock	James Moriarty	Main role
2026	The Other Bennet Sister	Thomas Hayward	Main role

Theatre

Year	Title	Role	Venue	Notes
2018	Chasing Bono	Ivan	Soho Theatre, London	
2020	Albion	Gabriel	Almeida Theatre, London	
2022	Sing Street	Brendan Lalor	Huntington Theatre Company, Boston	
2024	Hadestown	Orpheus	Lyric Theatre, London	
2026	John Proctor is the Villain	Carter Smith	Royal Court Theatre, London	
2026	An Oak Tree	Guest performer	The Other Palace, London	One-night engagement on 1 November 2026

Audio drama

Year	Title	Role	Notes
2026	Turpin	Richard Turpin	

== Awards and nominations ==
- 2018 - Sir Alec Guinness Award (presented by Catholic Association of Performing Arts)
