= John Tonkin (British Army officer) =

British military officer (1920–1995)

- Born: 21 July 1920; Singapore
- Died: 10 June 1995 (aged 74); Melbourne, Australia
- Military career
- Allegiance: United Kingdom
- Branch: British Army
- Rank: Captain
- Units: Royal Northumberland Fusiliers; Special Air Service
- Conflicts: Second World War; Operation Bulbasket

John Eliot Tonkin (21 July 1920 – 10 June 1995) was an officer of the British Army and a member of the Special Air Service (SAS) during the Second World War. He was one of the few survivors of Operation Bulbasket, where 34 members of SAS, 7 French Resistance fighters and one US Army Air Force pilot were captured and executed by members of the German Army. Following the war, he participated in the Falkland Islands Dependencies Survey from 1946 to 1947 as a navigator with fellow former SAS member Mike Sadler in Marguerite Bay, earning Tonkin the Polar Medal. He later worked for Shell Oil before moving to Australia in the 1950s where he became general manager of a mine.

== In popular culture ==
John Eliot Tonkin is portrayed by Jack Barton in the BBC action drama SAS: Rogue Heroes.
