= Up for Love =

- Film poster
- Un homme à la hauteur
- Directed by: Laurent Tirard
- Screenplay by: Laurent Tirard; Grégoire Vigneron
- Based on: Corazón de León by Marcos Carnevale
- Produced by: Sidonie Dumas; Vanessa van Zuylen
- Starring: Jean Dujardin; Virginie Efira
- Cinematography: Jérôme Alméras
- Edited by: Valérie Deseine
- Music by: Éric Neveux
- Production companies: VVZ Production; Gaumont; M6 Films; Scope Pictures
- Distributed by: Gaumont (France); Cinéart (Belgium)
- Release dates: 25 April 2016 (COLCOA); 4 May 2016 (France & Belgium)
- Running time: 98 minutes
- Countries: France; Belgium
- Language: French
- Budget: $14.2 million
- Box office: $8.3 million

Up for Love (original title: Un homme à la hauteur) is a 2016 Franco-Belgian romantic comedy film directed by Laurent Tirard and starring Jean Dujardin and Virginie Efira. The film is a remake of the 2013 Argentine film Corazón de León.

== Plot ==
Diane is a lawyer who went through a divorce a few years ago. After losing her phone, she receives a call from Alexandre, a funny and charming man who found the phone and intends to return it. As the conversation goes on, the two hit it off and decide to arrange a date. Diane heads for the meeting with great expectations only to realise Alexandre is very short (he is 1.36 m). Nonetheless, she tries to overcome her prejudices and accept Alexandre as he is.

== Cast ==
- Jean Dujardin as Alexandre
- Virginie Efira as Diane
- Cédric Kahn as Bruno
- Stéphanie Papanian as Coralie
- César Domboy as Benji
- Edmonde Franchi as Monique
- Manöelle Gaillard as Nicole
- Bruno Gomila as Philippe
- Myriam Tekaïa as Stéphanie
- François-Dominique Blin as Sébastien

== Reception ==
On the review aggregator website Rotten Tomatoes, 39% of 36 critics' reviews are positive.
