= Boogeyman Pop =

- Festival poster
- Directed by: Brad Michael Elmore
- Written by: Brad Michael Elmore
- Produced by: Kyle Cameron; Christian Forsberg; Daniel Berge Halvorson; James Paxton; Joshua Petersen; Alixandra von Renner
- Starring: James Paxton; M. C. Gainey; Dominique Booth; Greg Hill; Dillon Lane; Kyle Cameron; Alixandra von Renner; Andrew Scheafer; Caleb Campbell; Sam Jadzak
- Cinematography: Gneel Owen Costello
- Edited by: Brad Michael Elmore
- Music by: Wolfmen of Mars
- Production company: Blumhouse Productions
- Distributed by: Shudder
- Release date: June 23, 2018 (Cinepocalypse)
- Running time: 90 minutes
- Country: United States
- Language: English
- Budget: $75,000

Boogeyman Pop is a 2018 American indie anthology horror film written, edited and directed by Brad Michael Elmore. It stars James Paxton, M. C. Gainey, Dominique Booth, Greg Hill, Dillon Lane, Kyle Cameron, and Alixandra von Renner. The film was executive produced by Chris Weitz and Blumhouse Productions.

The film premiered at the Cinepocalypse Film Festival on June 23, 2018.

== Premise ==
A bat-wielding, masked killer in a rusted-out black Cadillac weaves in and out of three interlocking stories awash in sex, drugs, punk rock, black magic, and broken homes.

== Cast ==
- James Paxton as Tony
- M. C. Gainey as Ed
- Dominique Booth as Danielle
- Greg Hill as Matt
- Dillon Lane as Forrest
- Kyle Cameron as Slugger
- Alixandra von Renner as Nicole
- José Julián as Joe
- King Obra as Detective Tabor
- Dayton Sinkia as Steve
- Andrew Scheafer as Tyler
- Caleb Campbell as Adam
- Sam Jadzak as Blake

== Production ==
Principal photography on the film began in May 2015.

== Release ==
Boogeyman Pop premiered at the Cinepocalypse Film Festival on June 23, 2018.
