= Operation Bulbasket =

1944 UK operation in World War II

- Part of Western Front
Date	6 June – 24 July 1944
Location	Poitiers, Vienne department France
Result	British victory

Belligerents
United Kingdom	(Nazi Germany) Germany

Commanders and leaders
(United Kingdom) Captain John Tonkin	(Nazi Germany) Brigadeführer Heinz Lammerding

Strength
1st Special Air Service: 'B' Squadron (40 men); A small team from the Special Operations Executive 9 French Resistance fighters	Elements of the: 2nd SS Panzer Division Das Reich; 17th SS Panzergrenadier Division Götz von Berlichingen

Casualties and losses
34 Special Air Service men captured and executed 1 US Army Air Forces pilot captured and executed 7 French Resistance fighters captured and executed	150 German troops and an unknown number of Milice (estimated)

Operation Bulbasket was an operation undertaken by 'B' Squadron, 1st Special Air Service (SAS), behind enemy lines in German occupied France, between June and August 1944. The operation took place to the east of Poitiers in the Vienne department of south west France. Its objective was to block the Paris to Bordeaux railway line near Poitiers and to disrupt German reinforcements heading towards the Normandy beachheads, especially the 2nd SS Panzer Division – Das Reich.

During the course of the operation, the SAS discovered the whereabouts of a petrol supply train destined for the 2nd SS Panzer Division. The supply train was destroyed by Royal Air Force bombers the same night.

The SAS team made their base near Verrieres, the location of which was betrayed to the Germans. In the follow-up attack on their camp, 33 members of the SAS were captured and later executed together with a United States Army Air Forces (USAAF) pilot who had fallen in with them, after bailing out of his P-51 Mustang. Seven captured Maquisards were also executed in the woods after the attack. Three other SAS men, who had been wounded in the fight and taken to hospital, were executed by lethal injection while in their hospital beds.

== Background ==
The men involved in Operation Bulbasket were part of the Special Air Service. This was a unit of the British Army, formed in July 1941 by David Stirling and originally called 'L' Detachment, Special Air Service Brigade; 'L' being an attempt at deception, implying the existence of numerous other such units. It was conceived as a commando-type force intending to operate behind enemy lines during the North African Campaign.

In 1944, the Special Air Service Brigade was formed, consisting of the British 1st and 2nd Special Air Service, the French 3rd and 4th SAS and the Belgian 5th SAS. They were to undertake parachute drops behind German lines in France and, there, carry out operations supporting the Allied advance through Belgium, the Netherlands and eventually into Germany.

Map of France, with the Vienne department highlighted in red

In May 1944, the Supreme Headquarters Allied Expeditionary Force (SHAEF) issued an order for the Special Air Service Brigade to carry out two operations in France; Houndsworth in the area of Dijon was to be conducted by 'A' Squadron and Bulbasket, near Poitiers, by 'B' Squadron.

The focus of both operations would be the disruption of German reinforcements routing from the south of France to the Normandy beachheads. To carry out the operations, the men were to destroy supply dumps, block the Paris to Bordeaux railway line near Poitiers, and attack railway sidings and fuel trains. One formation they especially wanted to delay was the 2nd SS Panzer Division - Das Reich which was based in the area around Toulouse in the south of France. The intelligence experts at SHAEF, responsible for planning the Normandy landings, had estimated it would take three days for the panzer division to reach Normandy.

The officer in command of 'B' Squadron was Captain John Tonkin of the 1st SAS, with Second Lieutenant Richard Crisp his second in command. Both men were briefed on the operation by SHAEF in London 1 June 1944. Over the next two days they spent time at the headquarters of the Special Operations Executive, which had agents of 'F' section deployed in the operational area under the command of Amédée Maingard, code named 'Samuel'. Maingard had links with the two main French Resistance groups in the area, the Francs-tireurs et Partisans and the Armée Secrète. Tonkin was also given a list of rail targets by Headquarters Special Air Service.

== Mission ==
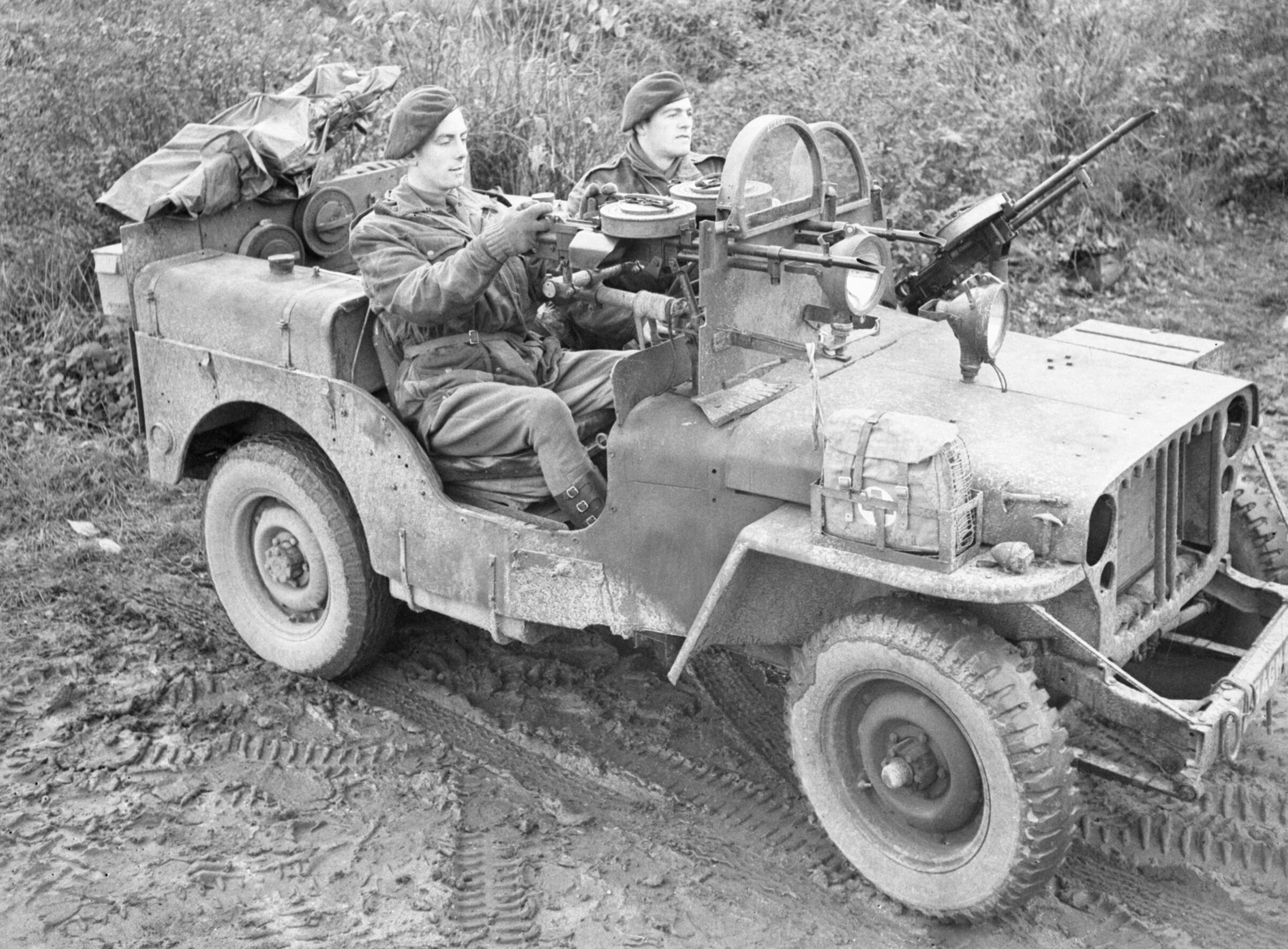
A Special Air Service Jeep armed with Vickers K machine guns of the type used during Operation Bulbasket

The advance party for Operation Bulbasket, including Tonkin, were flown to France in a Handley Page Halifax belonging to 'B' Flight, No. 161 Squadron RAF, the special duties squadron. Their drop zone was an area of the Brenne marshes—known as the 'Land of a Thousand Lakes'—19 miles (31 km) south west of Châteauroux. They arrived at 01:37 hours on 6 June 1944, a few hours before the beginning of the D-Day invasion of Normandy by the Allied forces. With the advance team on the flight was Captain William Crawshay and the "Hugh" team from Operation Jedburgh Crawshay was not pleased with the task of supporting Bulbasket, "mistrusting the SAS men's ability to operate effectively and not compromise security."

The next morning Tonkin, the advance team and Crawshay met with their SOE contact, 'Samuel' (Maingard) and Paul Mirguet, commander of the Armée secrète, one of the two armed resistance organizations in the area. They reached an agreement that Bulbasket would operate in the west in Vienne Department near the city of Poitiers and the Jedburghs, SOE, and the Armée secrète in Indre Department to the east, each with a major railroad in their district leading north toward Normandy. The principal objective of Bulbasket was to delay German reinforcements from reaching Normandy. The 2nd SS Panzer Division (Das Reich) with 15,000 men and 1,400 vehicles in southern France began its journey of 800 kilometres (500 miles) to Normandy on 8 June.

Two additional groups of SAS personnel from 'B' Squadron were parachuted in, one on 7 June and the second on 11 June. Also dropped at the same time were Jeeps armed with Vickers K machine guns. Once on the ground, the SAS Squadron set about preventing German reinforcements reaching Normandy. They attacked the rail network, laid mines, conducted vehicle patrols in their Jeeps and trained members of the French Resistance.

On 10 June a French railwayman informed Tonkin that a train composed of at least eleven petrol tankers was parked at the rail sidings at Châtellerault. These were the fuel reserves for the advancing 2nd SS Panzer Division. To confirm their location, Tonkin sent Lieutenant Tomos Stephens on a reconnaissance of the area. Travelling alone by bicycle, Stephens made the 74 miles (119 km) round trip - returning on 11 June. He confirmed the location of the petrol train. He also reported that it was too heavily guarded for the SAS squadron to deal with. Tonkin contacted England and requested an air attack on the train. That night a force of 12 Royal Air Force de Havilland Mosquito bombers, six each from No. 138 Wing RAF, based at RAF Lasham and 140 Wing, based at Gravesend in Kent, attacked the train in its sidings. The mission was a success.

To prevent their camp being located or compromised by German radio direction finding equipment or informers, Tonkin regularly moved its location. New camps had to be close to water and a drop zone for parachute supply. The Verrières camp was close to the drop zone at La Font d'Usson and had an adequate water supply. The SAS Squadron was at Verrières between 25 June and 1 July. The local population had also become aware of the camp and Tonkin was warned by Maingard that if the locals knew, informers would soon tell the Germans.

Tonkin ordered the squadron to move to a new camp just to the south west in the Bois des Cartes. This new camp was also close to the drop zone at La Font d'Usson where they were expecting supplies to be parachuted in over the night of 3/4 July. At Bois des Cartes, the water supply from the well failed. As a result, Tonkin decided to return to Verrières until a more suitable camp site could be found.

=== German attack ===
The German SS Security Police were informed that the SAS were camped in the forest near Verrières. On 1 July they sent agents into the forest to attempt to locate the camp and assembled an attacking force based on the reserve battalion of the 17th SS Panzergrenadier Division Götz von Berlichingen which was based at Bonneuil-Matours. With the arrival of the SAS Squadron back at their old base camp, Tonkin set out on 2 July to try to locate a new camp. He returned in the early hours of 3 July just before the Germans attacked, unaware they had managed to surround the camp during the night. The force in the forest camp consisted of 40 SAS men, the USAAF P-51 pilot, Second Lieutenant Lincoln Bundy, who had been shot down on 10 June 1944 and attached himself to the SAS, and nine men from the French Resistance.

The Germans attacked at dawn and fighting was over by 14:00. As the Germans searched the forest the SAS men tried to break out. A party of 34 were moving down a forest track when they were ambushed and captured. The leader of the party, Lieutenant Tomos Stephens, was beaten to death by a German officer using a rifle butt, and seven captured Maquisards were executed in the woods. Their fate was determined by the issue of the Commando Order by Adolf Hitler, which called for the execution of all captured commandos. The decision of who was going to execute them was the cause of an argument between the German Army and the SS, which the army won. _{Does this mean the army shot the allied soldiers, or refused to shoot them? Presumably the former?}

On 7 July, the surviving prisoners of war, 30 SAS men and Second Lieutenant Bundy, were taken into the woods near to St Sauvant, forced to dig their own graves then executed by a German firing squad at dawn. Their bodies were then buried in three separate graves. Three SAS men who had been wounded and hospitalized were killed by the administration of lethal injection.

=== Reprisal attack by the RAF ===
Jedburgh team "Hugh", operating in the area, reported back to Special Forces HQ requesting a reprisal attack on the headquarters of the 17th SS Panzergrenadier Division in Bonneuil-Matours. Special Forces HQ passed the request on to SAS Brigade HQ, who contacted No. 2 Group RAF, part of the RAF's Second Tactical Air Force. 2 Group's Air Officer Commanding, Air Vice-Marshal Basil Embry, assigned the reprisal attack to No. 140 Wing RAF, which had carried out Tonkins' request for the attack on the supply trains at Châtellerault the previous month.

By this time, No. 140 Wing was operating out of RAF Thorney Island in West Sussex, where, on 14 July 1944, Embry personally briefed the 14 crews selected for this operation. The plan of attack called for four phases: four Mosquitos would drop high explosive bombs; following them, six aircraft would drop US AN-M76 Napalm-filled incendiary bombs; the remaining aircraft would then drop more HE bombs and finally the aircraft would return to strafe the target before returning to base.

The Mosquitos left Thorney Island at about 21:00 hours, met up with an escort of 12 Mustang Mk. IIIs for the low-level daylight crossing of enemy-held territory in Northern France. They arrived on target at approximately 21:00 local time, when the German troops were eating their evening meal. The attack went as planned and all seven barrack blocks were destroyed, with local estimates of the number of German troops killed variying from 80 to about 200. All aircraft returned safely to Thorney Island in the early hours of 15 July.

=== Withdrawal ===
Tonkin and the remainder of the SAS Squadron (altogether eight survivors of the attack and three others who had been away on a smaller operation at the time) escaped, regrouped and carried on with the mission until the order to cease operations was received on 24 July 1944. From 10 June to 23 July, the SAS Squadron attacked railway targets 15 times; the Route nationale 10 south at Vivonne, and mined the Route nationale N147 between Angers, Poitiers and Limoges . They also had some success attacking targets of opportunity. During the night of 12/13 June 1944, Lieutenant Crisp, one of those later executed, was in command of a patrol that laid mines on the N147 in the Forêt du Défant, just before the 2nd SS Panzer Division arrived in the area.

The 2nd SS Panzer Division, advancing to Normandy, was responsible for the Tulle murders on 9 June 1944 and the massacre at the village of Oradour-sur-Glane on 10 June. The Division was also responsible for the capture of the Special Operations Executive agent Violette Szabo on 10 June 1944. They handed her over to the Sicherheitsdienst security police in Limoges; she was later executed.

== Aftermath ==
In December 1944, after the German Army had been driven from the area, men working in the forest near St Sauvant found an area of broken branches and disturbed earth. They started to examine the site and discovered what remained of a number of bodies. The local police force were informed and on 18 December started excavating the grave. A number of corpses were still wearing Allied uniforms. Most had their identity tags removed but two remained, which identified them as members of Operation Bulbasket, while another was identified by his name inside his battle dress tunic. A further body in civilian clothing was identified as that of Second Lieutenant Bundy.

The bodies of the 31 executed men were taken to Rom and reburied with full military honours in the village cemetery. The body of Lieutenant Stephens, who had been beaten to death, is interred in Verrières village cemetery. The bodies of the three soldiers executed by lethal injection in the hospital were never found, but the men are commemorated with a memorial plaque erected beside the Special Air Service graves in Rom cemetery.

== Summary of the operation ==
In an analysis of the achievements of Operation Bulbasket, the author Paul McCue lists the following:

1. The initiation of four air attacks and a possible fifth, killing upwards of 150 German troops and an unknown number of Milices
2. Responsibility for the destruction of crucial petrol stocks, delaying the progress of the 2nd SS Panzer Division – Das Reich towards the Normandy landing area
3. The delay of the 226th Infantry Division from Bayonne
4. The delay of the 227th Infantry Division from Carcassonne
5. Execution of 23 successful road and rail sabotage operations

Operation Bulbasket: Timeline

- 1 June 1944; Two officers of 'B' Squadron, 1st Special Air Service, Captain John Tonkin and Second Lieutenant Richard Crisp, were briefed on the operation by SHAEF in London
- 6 June; Their drop zone was an area of the Brenne marsh 19 miles (31 km) south west of Châteauroux, which they reached at 01:37 hours
- 7 June; further group from 'B' Squadron were parachuted in
- 9/10 June; move to 'Sazas' farm south of Montmorillon
- 11 June; further group from 'B' Squadron were parachuted in
- 11 June; location of petrol train confirmed. Tonkin contacted England and requested an air attack. That night a force of 12 de Havilland Mosquito bombers of No. 464 Squadron RAAF and No. 487 Squadron RNZAF, based at RAF Gravesend in Kent, attacked the train in its sidings. The mission was a success, destroying the fuel reserves for the 2nd SS Panzer Division Das Reich.
- 12/13 June; Lieutenant Crisp, one of those later executed, was in command of a patrol that laid mines on the N147 in the Forêt du Défant, just before the 2nd SS Panzer Division arrived in the area.
- 13 June; move to Nerignac
- 19 June; move to Pouillac
- 21 June; move to Persac
- 25 June 1944; The SAS Squadron move to Verrières.
- 1 July; move to a new camp just south in the Bois des Cartes.
- 2 July; return to Verrieres. The force in the forest camp consisted of 40 SAS men, a P-51 Mustang pilot, Second Lieutenant Lincoln Bundy and nine men from the French Resistance.
- 3/4 July: attack on Verrieres
- 5 July; survivors move to Foret de Plessac
- 6/7 July; men executed at St Sauvant
- 9 July; move to Charroux
- 14 July; move to Asnieres sur Blour or Forêt de Défant
- Subsequently, near Luchapt, Tonkin and the remainder of the Squadron (altogether eight survivors of the attack and three others), regrouped and carried on with the mission
- 24 July 1944; order to cease operations was received
- 28 July; move to north of Montmorillon
- 6/7 August; survivors extracted
