= SAS: Rogue Heroes =

British historical drama television series

- Series 1 DVD cover
- Genre: Historical drama
- Created by: Steven Knight
- Based on: SAS: Rogue Heroes by Ben Macintyre
- Written by: Steven Knight
- Directed by: Tom Shankland; Stephen Woolfenden
- Starring: Connor Swindells; Jack O'Connell; Alfie Allen; Dónal Finn; Jacob Ifan; Amir El-Masry; Corin Silva; Sofia Boutella; Theo Barklem-Biggs; Stuart Campbell; Jacob McCarthy; Bobby Schofield; Dominic West; Tom Glynn-Carney; Virgile Bramly; Gwilym Lee; Jack Barton; Mark Rowley; Matteo Franco; Anna Manuelli; Stuart Thompson
- Composer: Ilan Eshkeri
- Country of origin: United Kingdom
- Original language: English
- No. of series: 2
- No. of episodes: 12

Production
- Executive producers: Tommy Bulfin; Martin Haines; Emma Kingsman-Lloyd; Karen Wilson; Steven Knight
- Running time: 55–58 minutes
- Production companies: Kudos; Nebulastar

Original release
- Network: BBC One (UK); Epix (US; series 1); MGM+ (US; series 2–3)
- Release: 30 October 2022 – present

SAS: Rogue Heroes (titled Rogue Heroes in the United States and Australia) is a British historical drama television series created by Steven Knight. The series is based on the 2016 book of the same name by Ben Macintyre, and is broadly accurate to real events. It is produced by Kudos and Nebulastar and is distributed internationally by Banijay Rights, including to MGM+ in the United States.

SAS: Rogue Heroes premiered on BBC One on 30 October 2022 and depicts the origins of the British Army Special Air Service (SAS) during the Western Desert campaign of World War II. The second series premiered on 1 January 2025 and focused on SAS operations in the European theatre of war. In September 2025, it was renewed for a third series, which is planned to be released in 2027 and set in German-occupied France.

== Premise ==
The series begins in a Cairo hospital in 1941, when, after a failed training exercise, British Army officer David Stirling has the idea of creating a special commando unit that could operate deep behind enemy lines.

== Cast and characters ==
=== Main ===
- Connor Swindells as Lieutenant Colonel David Stirling
- Jack O'Connell as Lieutenant Colonel Paddy Mayne
- Alfie Allen as Lieutenant Jock Lewes (series 1)
- Dónal Finn as Second Lieutenant Eoin McGonigal (series 1; guest series 2)
- Jacob Ifan as Sergeant Pat Riley
- Amir El-Masry as Dr. Gamal (series 1)
- Corin Silva as Staff Sergeant Jim Almonds
- Sofia Boutella as Eve Mansour
- Theo Barklem-Biggs as Sergeant Reg Seekings
- Stuart Campbell as Second Lieutenant Bill Fraser
- Jacob McCarthy as Lance Corporal Johnny Cooper
- Bobby Schofield as Corporal Dave Kershaw
- Dominic West as Lieutenant Colonel Dudley Clarke (series 1; guest series 2)
- Tom Glynn-Carney as Corporal Mike Sadler (series 1)
- Virgile Bramly as Capitaine Georges Bergé (series 1)
- Gwilym Lee as Lieutenant Colonel Bill Stirling (series 2)
- Jack Barton as Lieutenant John Eliot Tonkin (series 2)
- Mark Rowley as Corporal Jock McDiarmid (series 2)
- Matteo Franco as Alfredo (series 2)
- Anna Manuelli as Alessia Biondi (series 2)
- Stuart Thompson as Lieutenant Anthony Greville-Bell (series 2)
- Nick Hargrove as Silus Roe (series 3)
- Lorne MacFadyen as Reverend Fraser McLuskey (series 3)

=== Supporting ===
- Miles Jupp as Major Alfred Knox (series 1)
- Anthony Calf as Archibald Stirling (series 1)
- Adrian Lukis as General Claude Auchinleck (series 1)
- Nicholas Nunn as Sergeant Peter Mitcham (series 1)
- Michael Shaeffer as Lieutenant General Neil Ritchie (series 1)
- Nisrine Adam as Nurse Indira (series 1)
- Kate Cook as Margaret Stirling (series 1)
- Isobel Laidler as Mirren Barford (series 1)
- Paul Boche as Sergent Walter Essner (series 1)
- Ian Davies as Major Randolph Churchill (series 1)
- César Domboy as Lieutenant Augustin Jordan (series 1)
- Tom Hygreck as Brevet Lieutenant André Zirnheld (series 1)
- Moritz Jahn as Caporal Herbert Brückner (series 1)
- Jordy Lagbre as Soldat "Grapes" (series 1)
- Arthur Orcier as Aspirant Marc Halévy (series 1)
- Ralph Davis as Captain Alexander Norton (series 1)
- Jason Watkins as Prime Minister Winston Churchill (series 1)
- David Alcock as Field Marshal Jan Smuts (series 1)
- Oliver Bennett as Lieutenant Colonel Jack Pringle (series 2)
- Paolo De Vita as Father Cavalli (series 2)
- Sandy Batchelor as Colonel Alastair Cram (series 2)
- Luca Morello as Matteo Amato (series 2)
- Lea Gavino as Sofia Amato (series 2)
- Robert Dölle as General der Fallschirmtruppe Richard Heidrich (series 2)
- Con O'Neill as General Bernard Montgomery (series 2)
- Edward Bennett as General Sir Miles Dempsey (series 2)
- Chris James-Gordon as Private Winston Best (series 2)
- Bianca Bardoe as Daphne Reece Williams (series 2)
- Andrew Dawson (series 3)
- Jake Jarratt (series 3)
- Bérangère McNeese (series 3)
- Hélie-Rose Dalmay (series 3)
- Leïla Muse (series 3)
- Hakim Djazir (series 3)

== Episodes ==
Series	Episodes	Originally released		Average UK viewers (millions)
Series	Episodes	First released	Last released	Average UK viewers (millions)
1	6	30 October 2022	4 December 2022	5.65
2	6	1 January 2025	26 January 2025	4.43

=== Series 1 (2022) ===
No.	Title	Directed by	Written by	Original release date	Viewers (millions) (Note: 7-day ratings)
1	"Episode 1"	Tom Shankland	Steven Knight	30 October 2022	6.55
In spring 1941, British forces in North Africa are losing ground against the advancing German Afrika Korps. British officer David Stirling takes part in military exercise where the trucks run out of fuel. Paddy Mayne defeats three British military police in a hand to hand fight while Jock Lewes and his unit steal parachutes from an Australian Army unit. Coming together, the three men come up with the idea of forming an elite parachute regiment to raid German Army truck convoys traveling through Libya. Mayne and Stirling also meet Eve Mansour, an Algerian Free French military intelligence officer based in Cairo who seeks their help for the Free French forces. Mayne is initially reluctant to participate and seeks transfer to the Burma campaign. Putting their idea into action, Lewes and Stirling parachute out of a plane into the desert, but Stirling's parachute tears and he is seriously injured.
2	"Episode 2"	Tom Shankland	Steven Knight	6 November 2022	5.63
Stirling is rescued by British forces and recovers at hospital in Cairo. Meanwhile, Mansour meets with Brigadier Dudley Clarke, seeking his help in recruiting paratroopers for the Free French forces. Mayne is sent to military prison after assaulting a superior officer. Still determined to establish his parachute unit, Stirling recruits Mayne and lobbies Commander-in-Chief Claude Auchinleck and General Neil Ritchie. Clarke agrees to support Stirling's plan on the condition that it adopts the name of a "ghost" military unit known as the Special Air Service. With the help of Mayne and Lewes, Stirling recruits several misfits and killers into the unit. As part of their first training exercise, the unit is tasked with travelling back from their training camp to Cairo.
3	"Episode 3"	Tom Shankland	Steven Knight	13 November 2022	5.67
For their first operation, the SAS led by Stirling and Lewes take part in a nighttime parachute drop during Operation Crusader in November 1941. Due to adverse conditions and darkness, the operation is a failure with a third of the unit killed or captured. After being rescued by the Long Range Desert Group, the SAS set up a new desert base and "raid" a New Zealand Army camp for supplies, including a piano. The SAS then takes part in a successful night time raid against German and Italian airfields in Libya, including Agedabia, inflicting significant casualties, and destroying aircraft and fuel tanks. The successful operation draws the attention of the British GHQ in Cairo and Mansour.
4	"Episode 4"	Tom Shankland	Steven Knight	20 November 2022	5.16
The SAS continue their operations against Axis forces along the Sirte route. During an operation, Lewes is fatally gunned down by a German Bf 109 fighter plane, leaving the unit without a training officer. Flashbacks depict Lewes' relationship with his fiancee Mirren Barford. Following Lewes' death, Stirling promotes several SAS personnel including Sergeant Mike Sadler. The SAS also adopts the motto "Who Dares Wins." Stirling pursues a romantic relationship with Mansour. Mansour and Clarke later arrange a meeting between Stirling and Free French Captain Georges Bergé, who proposes that the SAS incorporate a squadron of French paratroopers. Stirling tasks Mayne with training the French paratroopers in the ways of the SAS.
5	"Episode 5"	Tom Shankland	Steven Knight	27 November 2022	5.58
Paddy Mayne trains the Free French and French Foreign Legion soldiers in desert combat. The French unit also includes Jews, Germans, and African colonial soldiers. His unorthodox training methods, including dividing the troops along ethnic lines during a tower-building exercise, causes friction with the French soldiers particularly Lieutenant Augustin Jordan. The relationship deteriorates after Mayne assaults several of the French trainees in a drunken brawl. Meanwhile, Prime Minister Winston Churchill's son Randolph accompanies Stirling and some SAS operatives on an undercover mission to the Italian-occupied port of Benghazi. They plant explosives in the harbour and escape. An impressed Randolph promises to lobby his father for more equipment and funding to the SAS. Returning to base, Stirling convinces Mayne to make peace with Eoin's passing and repair relations with the French soldiers. As a conciliatory gesture, the two men serve the Free French soldiers a roasted gazelle.
6	"Episode 6"	Tom Shankland	Steven Knight	4 December 2022	5.33
In Cairo recovering from sand sores, Stirling meets with Winston Churchill and obtains his overwhelming support. Churchill widens the SAS area of operations to the entire southern Mediterranean, including Crete, in order to ensure that two convoys to reinforce Malta are successful following the fall of Tobruk in June 1942. Stirling plans attacks at multiple airbases on the Mediterranean coast, as well as Heraklion in Crete. The attacks are successful, although Mayne's group must scrub their attack on Berka satellite airfield #1 when their target is warned by early detonations from the French paratroopers' attack on the nearby Berca #2 airfield, and the French group led by Jordan is betrayed by one of the German Free French troopers before it reaches its targets of Derna and Martuba. During that failed operation, one of the French Jewish soldiers detonates an explosive that kills or wounds numerous enemy personnel. Bergé is captured by German forces in Crete. Stirling returns to Cairo to celebrate the success, but is dismayed to learn that Mansour has apparently been lost in an air crash while returning from Alexandria. After the United States enters the war, Stirling is captured while investigating a possible route which will allow the British and American forces to link up. With Stirling's capture, Mayne is promoted to major and placed in charge of the SAS.

=== Series 2 (2025) ===
No.	Title	Directed by	Written by	Original release date	Viewers (millions) (Note: 7-day ratings)
1	"Episode 1"	Stephen Woolfenden	Steven Knight	1 January 2025	5.38
After being denied leave to attend the funeral of his father, Paddy Mayne is arrested for fighting with military police at an upmarket Cairo restaurant. Later, David Stirling's older brother Lieutenant Colonel Bill Stirling offers to help Mayne save the Special Air Service from dissolution. Bolstered by new recruits, the unit is redesignated as the Special Raiding Squadron (SRS) and deployed during the Allied invasion of Sicily in 1943. During the marine landing, Mayne orders his troops not to aid stranded fellow soldiers whose gliders had landed in the sea. The SRS manage to capture a coastal fortification following a skirmish. Meanwhile, Eve Mansour is revealed to have survived her plane crash and resurfaces in London. The Free French government expresses frustration with the delayed Allied plans to liberate France. Elsewhere David Stirling, who is now a prisoner of war at Forte Di Gavi, receives news of the successful SRS landing in Sicily.
2	"Episode 2"	Stephen Woolfenden	Steven Knight	2 January 2025	4.36
The SRS capture Augusta from German forces. Mayne clashes with Bill's leadership of the British garrison. The SRS also come into conflict with the local Sicilian mafia, with whom the British Army have received orders to collaborate during the Allied invasion of Italy. The local Catholic priest, who is a secret German collaborator, offers to help broker peace between the SRS and mafia by arranging a lunch meeting between the two groups. However, this meeting turns out to be a ploy to lure the SRS and members of the Italian Communist partisans into a trap involving German Ju-87 Stuka dive bombers. Before leaving Augusta, Mayne manages to recruit former SAS Sergeant Jim Almonds into his unit. Meanwhile, a disguised Eve manages to meet with David at Forte Di Gavi. While David is jealous of his older brother Bill, she manages to convince him to let Bill take charge of the SAS. Eve later joins Mayne and the unit as they leave Augusta.
3	"Episode 3"	Stephen Woolfenden	Steven Knight	5 January 2025	4.12
The episode opens with German forces receiving Fuhrer Adolf Hitler's Commando Order ordering the execution of Allied commandos in Europe and North Africa. Bill Stirling clashes with the SAS's informal culture but tells Paddy that he is willing to tolerate his unit's behaviour in return for their battlefield results. The SAS is tasked with capturing the Italian town of Termoli from German forces. Pat Riley and two Italian resistance members are tasked with making contact with the local Italian resistance cell and eliminating a traitor. Over the next few days, the SAS advance on the outskirts of Termoli. Paddy gives a wounded German soldier a mercy killing at the request of his older brother. The SAS subsequently capture Termoli with the help of the Italian resistance. John Tonkin and several SAS soldiers attempt to blow up Campomarino bridge but are ambushed by German forces, who capture Tonkin and kill his comrades, though Johnny Cooper escapes back to Termoli. The German officer orders Tonkin's execution per the Commando Order. Meanwhile, David attempts to escape from Forte Di Gavi but is recaptured and placed in solitary confinement.
4	"Episode 4"	Stephen Woolfenden	Steven Knight	12 January 2025	4.11
In Termoli, the SAS soldier Reg Seekings stays with a local Italian family and befriends their young son Matteo. Paddy and his SAS unit are also joined by Eve, who is now working as a war correspondent. The 16th Panzer Division launches a counter-offensive to retake Termoli. During the siege, several civilians including Matteo and his family are killed, which affects Reg deeply. The SAS and their Italian allies dig in for a siege, holding the Germans long enough for reinforcements led by Bill Stirling to arrive. Eve also takes part in the defence of Termoli. Following the siege, Bill briefs Paddy and Eve about the new German Commando Order. Bill warns Paddy that the Commando Order does not give the SAS an excuse to mistreat enemy personnel. John Tonkin is saved from execution by Luftwaffe General Richard Heidrich, who invites him for dinner and questions him about Paddy Mayne. Admiring his British adversaries, Heidrich admits his distaste for the Commando Order but says he is compelled to obey superior orders. Meanwhile, David steels himself in solitary confinement.
5	"Episode 5"	Stephen Woolfenden	Steven Knight	19 January 2025	4.15
Following the defence of Termoli, the SAS bury and mourn their fallen comrades. The unit is visited by General Bernard Montgomery, who praises the unit's combat skills and allows them to retain their sand coloured berets. Eve lobbies the British military commanders for the SAS to be allowed to train French special forces for the impending Liberation of France. The SAS and their partisan allies are later deployed to destroy German-controlled trains and railways near Florence before returning to England for leave. Four SAS soldiers are executed by German forces under the Commando Order. Meanwhile, John Tonkin escapes his German captors. After being helped by Italian partisans, he reunites with a female British friend who has married an Italian. Elsewhere, David learns that his Italian captors have fled Forte Di Gavi following the fall of the Italian Fascist regime but is traumatised by his ordeal in solitary confinement.
6	"Episode 6"	Stephen Woolfenden	Steven Knight	26 January 2025	4.48
The SAS take leave in the United Kingdom. Bill Stirling meets with General Montgomery, who reveals that the SAS will be deployed as paratroopers to secure key positions during the Normandy landings. Against military protocol, Stirling divulges the D-Day invasion plans to Paddy, which earns him the disapproval of the British military leadership. Stirling later resigns from his command after the British military authorities commence an investigation into his relationship with Eve Mansour. Meanwhile, David eludes the German forces, who have been sent to occupy Forte Di Gavi following the Italian capitulation, by hiding in the ventilation shafts. However, he is captured after attempting to pose as a German soldier and is sent to Colditz. In Scotland, the SAS undergo training in preparation for the Normandy landings. The episode ends with Paddy and other SAS paratroopers parachuting during the Normandy landings.

== Production ==
In May 2019, it was announced that Peaky Blinders creator Steven Knight would adapt the 2016 book SAS: Rogue Heroes by Ben Macintyre for a television series after Endemol Shine UK's Kudos had optioned the rights to the book, with no broadcaster yet attached. In August later that year, the BBC announced that they had commissioned the project as a six-episode series for BBC One. SAS: Rogue Heroes was commissioned by Piers Wenger and Charlotte Moore of BBC Drama and BBC Content respectively and would be executive produced by Steven Knight, Karen Wilson, Martin Haines and Emma Kingsman-Lloyd for Kudos, and Tommy Bulfin for BBC One, and would be distributed internationally by Endemol Shine International.

In March 2021, principal photography began, with Connor Swindells, Jack O'Connell, Alfie Allen, Sofia Boutella and Dominic West confirmed in starring roles. The series was written by Steven Knight and directed by Tom Shankland. In June, César Domboy joined the cast. Alongside Kudos, the series was produced by Steven Knight's company Nebulastar and Stephen Smallwood was also listed as a producer. The production was now repped by Banijay Rights after Banijay Entertainment had acquired Kudos as part of its purchase of the Endemol Shine Group the previous year. Filming for SAS: Rogue Heroes took place in the United Kingdom and Morocco and wrapped around late October 2021. The first series depicts the origins of the British Army Special Air Service (SAS) during the Western Desert Campaign of World War II. The storyline is a broadly accurate representation of real events, as described by Ben Macintyre in his book.

On 4 December 2022, it was renewed for a second series, which focused on the SAS operations in the European theatre of war. Filming for the second series occurred in Croatia, Italy, England and Scotland over a six month period between May and September 2023. According to director Stephen Woolfenden, production for the six-episode season consisted of 81 shoot days, about 370 scenes, and almost 2,000 slates over two units.

In September 2025, it was renewed for a third series, which is set in German-occupied France and also features the Maquis of the French Resistance movement. Nick Hargrove, Lorne MacFadyen, Andrew Dawson and Jake Jarratt joined the cast for the third series, while Bérangère McNeese, Hélie-Rose Dalmay, Leïla Muse and Hakim Djazir were later confirmed in November 2026. Filming for the third series occurred in the UK and France in September 2025.

== Release ==
The BBC first released first look images for SAS: Rogue Heroes after filming had concluded on 31 October 2021. The first trailer was released in September 2022. The series premiered on BBC One on 30 October 2022 in the UK. It was distributed internationally by Banijay Rights. The series premiered on Epix on 13 November 2022 after they had acquired the rights from Banijay in early November 2021 as the first international buyer.

In September 2024, the BBC released first look images for the second series. The first trailer for the season was released in November The second series premiered on 1 January 2025 on BBC One in the United Kingdom and on 12 January 2025 on MGM+ in the United States

In November 2026, the BBC revealed first look images for the third series and confirmed that it would release in 2027.

Banijay Rights distributes the series internationally and has licensed it to HBO Max, Amazon Prime Video, SBS, Starzplay, Paramount+, Canal+, and TVNZ+.

== Reception ==
=== Series 1 ===
The review aggregator website Rotten Tomatoes reported an approval rating of 100% with an average rating of 8.3/10, based on 12 critic reviews. The website's critical consensus said: "With a terrific cast inhabiting this roster of likeable rapscallions, Rogue Heroes is a fun throwback to down-and-dirty adventure stories." Metacritic gave the series a weighted average score of 78 out of 100 based on seven critic reviews, indicating "Generally favourable reviews".

The series' first episode was watched 5,526,000 times on BBC iPlayer alone during 2022, making it the fifth most viewed individual programme on the platform and the fourth most popular on the BBC that yearand the sixth most-watched UK drama series of 2022. According to Collider in June 2026, SAS: Rogue Heroes was currently among the top most popular titles on HBO Max in multiple markets.

Writing in The Guardian, Antony Beevor commented that the series was "unmissable viewing", and "achieved the right balance of irreverence and admiration all the way through with a brilliant contrast in characters".

=== Series 2 ===
On Metacritic, the second series has gained a weighted average score of 83 out of 100 based on five critic reviews, indicating "Universal acclaim".

Jack Seale of The Guardian gave the second series a positive review, awarding it five stars. Seale wrote that the series explored the themes of sacrifice and extreme adversity "in bringing out the male psyche." He also praised the second series' rock music soundtrack, freeze frames and action sequences.

== Historical accuracy ==
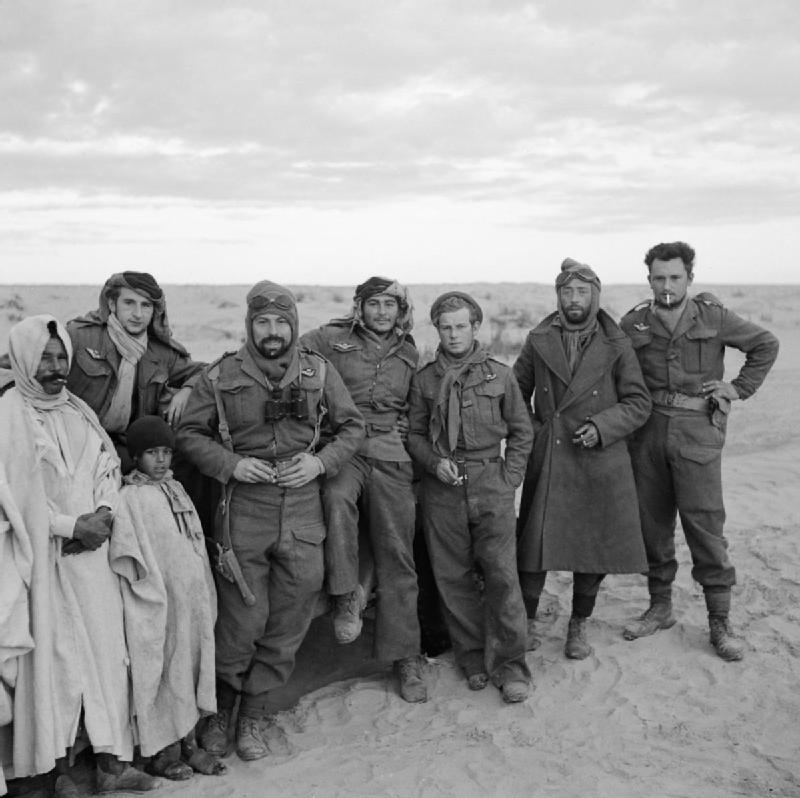
Members of the 'French Squadron SAS' (1ere Compagnie de Chasseurs Parachutistes) in Tunisia. Previously a company of Free French paratroopers, the French SAS squadron were the first of a range of units "acquired" by Major Stirling as the SAS expanded.

At the beginning of each episode in the first series, the viewer is informed that the series is "Based on a true story", and that "the events depicted which seem most unbelievable… are mostly true". In the second series the message was changed to "Inspired by true events... But be aware... This is NOT a history lesson."

Unlike the main trio of Stirling, Mayne, and Lewes, the character of Eve Mansour is fictional. Sofia Boutella notes, however, that her character is influenced by real-life female spies such as Noor Inayat Khan and Virginia Hall.

As military historian Antony Beevor noted, while events surrounding the creation of the SAS "certainly defy belief", it is true that "some liberties with the precise record" were taken – for example, in the scripting of a romantic association between David Stirling and Mansour, the French intelligence agent. However, his opinion was that these were "mainly additions, fleshing out characters and context", rather than being significant "distortions" of the facts.

Billy Foley, writing in The Irish News, was somewhat more critical of the artistic license employed, particularly in the depiction of Paddy Mayne. Far from being "a brutish, rough man who was looked down on by the aristocracy of his native Newtownards and despised the toff officer class of the British army", Foley pointed out that the ostensibly working class Mayne was in fact born to a landed family, went to grammar school, played rugby for the British & Irish Lions, and studied at Queen's University Belfast before qualifying as a solicitor. Historian Damien Lewis also said it was "nonsense" to portray Mayne as a "thug and drunken lout", when he "cared passionately for those men he commanded".

Moreover, it was Stirling who asked General De Gaulle to have Frenchmen in the SAS because he needed men ready to do anything to deal with the Germans. So the 1re Compagnie de Chasseurs Parachutistes was sent, which became the French Squadron SAS.

Historian Gavin Mortimer wrote for the The Spectator that the "main problem with Rogue Heroes is that it is true to David Stirling's version of how the SAS was born. But as I make clear in my recent biography of Stirling, The Phoney Major, based on two decades of research, he was a master at twisting the truth to suit his own ends", adding that Paddy Mayne "was not the borderline psychopath depicted in Rogue Heroes. I know because I've interviewed scores of men who served under Mayne in the SAS."
