= Alien Containment =

2019 British short film

- Directed by: Chris Reading
- Written by: Chris Reading
- Based on: Alien by: Dan O'Bannon; Ronald Shusett
- Produced by: Quaid Kocur; Patch Ward
- Starring: Gaia Weiss; Theo Barklem-Biggs; Sharon Duncan-Brewster
- Cinematography: Howard Mills
- Music by: Simon Porter
- Production companies: Tongal Studios; 20th Century Fox
- Distributed by: IGN; 20th Century Fox
- Release dates: March 29, 2019 (IGN); May 3, 2019 (Fox)
- Running time: 10 minutes
- Country: United Kingdom
- Budget: $35,000

Alien Containment is a short film based on the science fiction action media franchise Alien. Released via IGN on March 29, 2019, coinciding with the 40th anniversary of the franchise, the film was written and directed by Chris Reading, through Tongal Studios and 20th Century Fox. Starring Gaia Weiss, Theo Barklem-Biggs, and Sharon Duncan-Brewster, the film follows the survivors of the colonial transport Borrowdale who discover that one of their number may be harboring a chestburster.

The sixteenth short film in the Alien franchise, it received a generally positive critical reception. James Paxton would reprise his role as MacWhirr from the film in Alien Alone.

== Plot ==
As the colonial transport spaceship Borrowdale breaks apart and explodes, four survivors who escaped via a shuttle — Ward, Nass, Albrecht, and the comatose Mills — discuss the xenomorph outbreak that had taken place aboard the ship, and the chance one or more of them may have been contaminated by a facehugger. After Albrecht discloses that Weyland-Yutani had okayed the Borrowdale's destruction to prevent the outbreak from spreading, Nass becomes paranoid that Mills is infected before attempting to kill him, before he realises he himself is the one infected as a chestburster begins to tear its way out of him. As Ward attempts to help Nass, Albrecht flees to another room onboard the shuttle and seals the others off via a hatch, only for a sudden impact — a rescue ship docking to their shuttle — leading her to accidentally reopening it, letting lose the infant xenomorph. As the infant mauls Albrecht, Ward scrawls "Do Not Open" in her blood on the shuttle window to prevent the rescue crew from letting the xenomorph onboard their own ship.

In a post-credits scene, Mills awakens to find Nass' corpse beside him. Hearing the now full-size xenomorph moving, he clutches his oxygen mask back to his face to return to unconsciousness.

== Cast ==
- Gaia Weiss as Ward
- Theo Barklem-Biggs as Nass
- Sharon Duncan-Brewster as Albrecht
- Adam Loxley as Mills (Unconscious Man)
- James Paxton as Man on Radio (Note: Paxton would later portray the "Man on Radio", named "MacWhirr", in Alien Alone.) (voice)

== Production ==
In July 2018, it was reported that 20th Century Fox had joined forces with Tongal Studios to produce a series of Alien short films to coincide with the 40th anniversary of the franchise. By March 2019, the details of the short films were released, Tongal co-founder and CEO James DeJulio describing the joint-production as "reflective of Tongal's mission to bring creative opportunities to the next generation of talent." The first short released and the sixteenth overall in the franchise, Alien Containment was written and directed by Chris Reading with a budget of $35,000, described as "captur[ing] the mood and contrast of Alien: Covenant with the DIY nature of the original Alien movie", with visual effects provided by The Brewery VFX. Following writing an "economical" screenplay, Reading attributed the film's post-credits scene's "tonal turn into comedic territory" as a result of on-set improvisation "get[ting] a dark laugh from the audience".

== Release ==
Alien Containment was released on the IGN website on March 29, 2019, after which it was uploaded to the Alien Universe website, and all Alien social media pages on May 5, 2019, the short film then premiering alongside five others at the Emerald City Comic Con in Seattle, and as a Movies Anywhere-exclusive bonus feature accompanying the digital release of Alien.

== Reception ==
Alien Containment received a positive critical reception. Josh Weiss of Syfy complimented the film for its structure as "a one-act play of sci-fi horror", as well as for the "intriguing" concepts introduced over its events, with Vijay Varman of Circle of Cinema praising both the filmmaking as "a masterclass in using a minimal budget to portray a CGI-infused landscape", and Sharon Duncan Brewster's "incredibly complex performance in the vein of Ian Holm’s Ash".
