= Last Train to Fortune =

- Theatrical release poster
- Directed by: Adam Rifkin
- Written by: Michele Rifkin
- Produced by: Michael P.J. Gerstein; James Paxton; Matt Williams; Adam Rifkin; Brad Wyman
- Starring: Malcolm McDowell; James Paxton; Mary Steenburgen; Bernadette Peters; Laura Marano
- Cinematography: Chase Bowman
- Edited by: Daniel Flesher
- Music by: Jack Ryan Sullivan
- Production companies: Creative Media Arts; Future Artists Entertainment; Intention Forward Productions
- Distributed by: TriCoast Worldwide; Vitagraph Films
- Release dates: November 8, 2025 (Ojai Playhouse); September 18, 2026 (United States)
- Running time: 94 minutes
- Country: United States
- Language: English
- Box office: $7,817

Last Train to Fortune is a 2025 American western comedy film written by Michele Rifkin, directed by Adam Rifkin, and starring Malcolm McDowell, James Paxton, Mary Steenburgen, Bernadette Peters, and Laura Marano.

== Cast ==
- Malcolm McDowell as Cecil Peachtree
- James Paxton as Jedidiah Dooley
- Mary Steenburgen as Miss Maybelle
- Bernadette Peters as Miss Lily
- Laura Marano as Amanda
- Mehdi Ajroudi as Charlie
- Lee Arenberg as The Sheriff
- Marshall Bell as The Station Master
- M. C. Gainey as Snake

== Production ==
The screenplay for Last Train to Fortune was written in 1986 by Michele Rifkin (Adam Rifkin's mother), for a contest run by PBS. Malcolm McDowell was attached to star, with Lindsay Anderson directing, but Anderson's death in 1994 put the production on hold. Bill Paxton was to have portrayed Dooley, before his death in 2017. His son James was eventually cast in the same part.

Principal photography wrapped by April 2023.

== Release ==
The film had its world premiere on November 8, 2025, at the Ojai Playhouse, in Ojai, California, in association with the Ojai Film Festival. It was released in the United States on September 18, 2026.
