= Ambrose McGonigal =

High Court Judge in Northern Ireland (1917-1979)

Sir Ambrose Joseph McGonigal, MC (22 November 1917 – 22 September 1979) was a High Court Judge in Northern Ireland.

McGonigal was born in South Dublin in 1917, the son of son of John McGonigal KC, county court judge for Co. Tyrone (1939–43), and his wife Margaret Davoren, daughter of Richard Davoren, solicitor, of Friarsland, Roebuck, Co. Dublin. His brother, Eoin McGonigal, was a founding member of the Special Air Service. He was educated at Clongowes Wood College and Queen's University Belfast.

He served with distinction in the British Army during the Second World War and was awarded the MC in 1944. In 1948 he was called to the Northern Ireland Bar and became a High Court judge on 8 March 1968. In 1975 McGonigal was appointed a Lord Justice of Appeal. He was knighted on 1 July 1975.

He died in 1979, aged 62.

Justice McGonigal is mentioned in Tony Geraghty's The Irish War: the hidden conflict between the IRA and British Intelligence as having been "forced to carry a gun under his robe" due to terrorism in Northern Ireland, which would claim the lives of at least five judges or justices in Northern Ireland.

His son, Eoin McGonigal, SC, practises in Dublin, Ireland.

== Torturers' Charter ==
As a consequence of a report by Lord Diplock on legal procedures to deal with terrorist activities in Northern Ireland, Diplock courts were instated on which among others Lord Justice McGonigal presided. As part of his work there he made a ruling that came to be known as the ‘Torturters' Charter’: “In a famous, or infamous, ruling, Lord Justice McGonigal said that a ‘blow’ did not necessarily render a statement inadmissable.”
