= Paddy Condon =

James Condon
- Born: County Tipperary, Ireland
- Died: 14 March 1964; Kalimantan, Borneo
- Military career
- Allegiance: United Kingdom
- Branch: British Army
- Rank: Trooper
- Nickname: Paddy
- Units: D Squadron, 22 Special Air Service
- Conflicts: Indonesia–Malaysia confrontation

James "Paddy" Condon (died 14 March 1964) was a British SAS soldier during the Indonesia–Malaysia confrontation. While a part of D squadron under the command of Sgt. Richardson and patrolling to detect mortars that had been shelling Gurkha positions, Condon's unit encountered four enemy soldiers at dusk. Scattering for emergency rendezvous locations, the unit's signaller, was not seen again. His bergen was later located by Sgt. Richardson after three days of searching, and it was surmised that Condon, having been wounded in the thigh, either died in captivity or was shot by his captors. His body was never returned, and he became the first member of the SAS to be killed operating inside Kalimantan, in Borneo. His death created a great animosity between the Indonesians and the SAS regiment.
