= Reg Seekings =

British military Warrant Officer

- Born: Albert Reginald Seekings; 19 March 1920; Stuntney, Cambridgeshire, United Kingdom
- Died: 16 March 1999 (aged 78); Stanton, Suffolk, United Kingdom
- Spouse: Monica Smith
- Military career
- Allegiance: United Kingdom
- Branch: British Army
- Service years: 1940–1945
- Rank: Warrant Officer
- Units: Layforce; Special Air Service
- Conflicts: Second World War

Albert Reginald Seekings (19 March 1920 – 16 March 1999) was a warrant officer of the British Army and a founding member of the Special Air Service (SAS). In 1940, along with his brother, he volunteered for part of Layforce in the Second World War. In 1941, he joined the SAS in North Africa, taking part in numerous raids. He later served in the European theater and took part in the liberation of the Bergen-Belsen concentration camp.

Seekings is the subject of a biography titled ‘SAS: Duty Before Glory’ whereby he is attributed as one of or perhaps the most battle-hardened British soldier of WW2.

Seekings later served in the British South Africa Police, and emigrated to Rhodesia (now Zimbabwe) to farm tobacco. Seekings then returned to the United Kingdom shortly after Zimbabwean independence.

== In popular culture ==
Seeking is portrayed by Theo Barklem-Biggs in the BBC action drama SAS: Rogue Heroes.
