= Johnny Wiseman =

British SAS officer

John Martin Wiseman
- Born: 27 January 1916; Kingston upon Thames
- Died: 23 August 2005 (aged 89)
- Military career
- Allegiance: United Kingdom
- Branch: British Army
- Rank: Major
- Units: Duke of Cornwall's Light Infantry; Special Air Service
- Conflicts: Second World War
- Awards: Military Cross; Croix de guerre (France)
- Other work: Company director

John Wiseman, MC (27 January 1916 – 23 August 2005) was a British Army officer and Second World War Special Air Service (SAS) veteran, where he saw action in the long range desert raiding parties of the North African Campaign, then in front line support of the invasion of Sicily and Italy during which he was awarded the Military Cross, followed by commando operations deep behind German lines following the Allied invasion of Normandy in June 1944.

== Early life and army career ==
Wiseman was born in Kingston upon Thames, and educated at St Paul's school and Pembroke College, Cambridge, where he studied languages. In 1937 Wiseman went into the optical instrument business founded by his father, Max, who arrived from Germany in the 1920s. They were a Jewish family and a taped interview with him and archivist Martin Sugarman is at the Jewish Military Museum in London, where his MC and medal group with photograph are on display. On the outbreak of war he attempted to join the Royal Air Force, but was told to "wait until contacted". Instead, he chose to join the North Somerset Yeomanry at the rank of Trooper.

With the Yeomanry he saw action against the Vichy French forces in Syria, opposing the Allied occupation of Lebanon. His fluency in French and German earned him a place in officer training in Cairo. Wiseman was eventually commissioned as an officer with the Duke of Cornwall's Light Infantry. On hearing of David Stirling's newly formed SAS unit he sought Stirling out, who had a flat in Cairo.

== Special Air Service ==
=== Africa ===
Wiseman joined up with the SAS in their training base in Kabrit, Egypt. Wiseman saw action across North Africa in SAS / Long Range Desert Group joint operations raiding Axis airfields and transport/communications infrastructure.

=== Sicily and Italy ===
Wiseman earned his Military Cross in action in the Allied invasion of Sicily, as commander of a section in the Special Raiding Squadron (SRS) under Paddy Mayne. Wiseman's unit scaled the cliffs of Cape Murro di Porco on the morning of 10 July 1943, in order to assault a coastal battery defending the beaches to be landed by the main Allied force. Achieving surprise, his small force killed, captured or wounded 40 of the enemy, while suffering no casualties themselves. In all, in 17 hours the SRS, in support of the British XIII Corps, had killed over 200 Italians, captured a further 450, and silenced three batteries of guns.

By the time of the Allied operations in Italy, Wiseman was a lieutenant and a section commander within 1 Troop. During a German counterattack on Termoli on the east coast of southern Italy, Wiseman was the only survivor after a German shell killed 17 of his men in a direct hit on their truck, with Wiseman leaning out the window in the passenger seat talking to a runner. The shell, probably a stray shot, had caused the single biggest loss of the SAS, and had likely been exacerbated by the fact many of the men had been carrying armed Hawkins grenades as they had been about to depart to shore up a defensive line.

=== Normandy ===
By the time of the Normandy landings, Wiseman had reached the rank of captain commanding 1 Troop, A Squadron, 1 SAS. Wiseman was one of three troop commanders in A Squadron, which as the direct descendant of L Detachment, considered itself the crème de la crème in the inter-rivalry of the SAS, which by now numbered 4 Regiments of various nationalities and levels of experience. In June 1944 Wiseman took part in Operation Houndsworth, conducting operations behind the German lines in France, near Dijon, disrupting the German's reinforcement of their forces in Normandy, assisted by the French Maquis.

=== HQ ===
On withdrawal of A Squadron back to England in September 1944, Wiseman was awarded the Croix de guerre, and on promotion to major was given command of SAS Headquarters.

== Later life ==
After the war, Wiseman rejoined the family optics company, M Wiseman & Company, becoming a director of its successor, UK Opticals. Wiseman retired in 1982, and died on 23 August 2005, aged 89.

== See also ==
- List of former Special Air Service personnel
- List of SAS operations
