= Johnny Cooper (British Army officer) =

British military officer (1922–2002)

- Born: Jonny Murdoch Cooper; 6 June 1922
- Died: 12 July 2002 (aged 80)
- Spouse: Constance Cooper
- Military career
- Allegiance: United Kingdom
- Branch: British Army; Sultan of Oman's Armed Forces
- Service years: 1941–1962; 1962–1966
- Rank: Lieutenant-Colonel (Oman)
- Service number: 2698113
- Units: Scots Guards; No. 8 (Guards) Commando; Special Air Service
- Commands: Muscat Regiment (Oman)
- Conflicts: Second World War; Malayan Emergency; Jebel Akhdar campaign Aden Emergency
- Awards: Distinguished Conduct Medal; MBE

John Murdoch Cooper (6 June 1922 – 12 Jul 2002) was an officer of the British Army and the Sultan of Oman's Armed Forces, and a founding member of the Special Air Service (SAS).

== Military career ==
Lying about his age, he joined the Scots Guards at the age of 17 and volunteered for the No. 8 (Guards) Commando. He joined the SAS at the age of 19, being its youngest member. He was part of the January 1943 operation in Tunisia where one of SAS founders David Stirling was captured, but managed to escape along with Mike Sadler and Freddie Taxis. The group hiked more than 100 miles in the desert before being found by French Foreign Legion and American 26th Infantry Regiment in Tozeur. He later served in the European theatre and took part in the liberation of the Bergen-Belsen concentration camp.

After the Second World War, he served during the Malayan Emergency, first with the Malayan Scouts, and then with 22 SAS. He is acknowledged in the Author's Note at the front of Dennis Holman's 1958 book "Noone of the Ulu", about Pat Noone and his brother, the British anthropologist and intelligence agent Richard Noone, who worked in the deep jungle (the 'ulu') with aborigine tribes, assisting the British Army fight communist rebels. In 1958, Cooper was in command of A Squadron 22 SAS when the call came to go to Oman to fight rebels on the Jebel Akhdar. His squadron arrived in January 1959 to assist John Watts and D Squadron 22 SAS in the famous attack. In Oman, he joined up with ex-SOE operative Colonel David Smiley, who was in command of the Sultan of Oman's Armed Forces, serving as a Lieutenant-Colonel and commanding the Muscat Regiment. He then mysteriously disappeared, with the Sultan and British diplomats unsure if had gone home to see his mother. He resurfaced in Yemen, working covertly with David Smiley to supply British-backed Yemeni Royalist forces with Israeli arms to fight Egyptian-backed rebels. David Stirling was in Yemen at the same time.

== In popular culture ==
Cooper is portrayed by Jacob McCarthy in the BBC action drama SAS: Rogue Heroes.
