= Jock Lewes =

British Army officer

- Born: John Steel Lewes; 21 December 1913; Calcutta, Bengal, British India
- Died: 30 December 1941 (aged 28); El Gaus, Cyrenaica, Italian Libya
- Military career
- Allegiance: United Kingdom
- Branch: British Army
- Service years: 1935–1941
- Rank: Lieutenant
- Nickname: Jock
- Service number: 65419
- Units: Rifle Brigade; Welsh Guards; L Detachment, Special Air Service Brigade
- Conflicts: Second World War: North African Campaign; Western Desert Campaign; Operation Crusader †
- Memorials: Alamein Memorial

Lieutenant John Steel "Jock" Lewes (21 December 1913 – 30 December 1941) was a British Army officer who served in World War II. He was the founding principal training officer of the Special Air Service (SAS). The SAS's founding commander, David Stirling, said later of Lewes, "Jock could far more genuinely claim to be founder of the SAS than I." Lewes also invented an explosive device for use by the SAS, the eponymous Lewes bomb.

== Early life, family and education ==
Lewes was born in Calcutta to a British father, chartered accountant Arthur Harold Lewes, and an Australian mother, Elsie Steel Lewes. The family moved to Australia and Lewes grew up at Bowral, New South Wales. As a teenager he attended The King's School, Parramatta.

Lewes travelled to the United Kingdom to attend Christ Church, Oxford, from September 1933, where he studied philosophy, politics and economics. In 1936–37, he was president of the Oxford University Boat Club. During 1937 he voluntarily gave up his place in the Oxford Blue boat crew, to assist it in winning that year's University Boat Race, and ending a 15-year winning streak by Cambridge. Lewes travelled to Berlin to work for the British Council and, before the events of Kristallnacht in 1938, was briefly an admirer of Hitler and the Nazi state.

A younger brother, David Steel Lewes, was later prominent as a cardiologist in the United Kingdom and was a Royal Air Force medical officer during the war.

== Military career ==
=== Early career ===
Lewes was first commissioned to the British Army's General List as a university candidate on 5 July 1935, while a student at Oxford. At the outbreak of the Second World War, he was briefly transferred to a Territorial Army unit, the 1st Battalion, Tower Hamlets Rifles, Rifle Brigade on 2 September 1939 before joining the Welsh Guards on 28 October.

=== SAS ===
In 1941, Lewes was in a group of volunteers assembled by David Stirling to form a unit dedicated to raiding missions against the lines of communication of Axis forces in North Africa. For military deception and counterespionage purposes, this platoon-sized group was at first officially known as "L" Detachment, Special Air Service Brigade. To destroy Axis vehicles, members of the SAS surreptitiously attached small explosive charges. Lewes noticed the respective weaknesses of conventional blast and incendiaries, as well as their failure to destroy vehicles in some cases. He improvised a new, combined charge out of plastic explosive, diesel and thermite. The Lewes bomb was used throughout the Second World War.

=== Death ===
In late December 1941, Lewes was involved in an SAS/Long Range Desert Group raid on Axis airfields in Libya. As the raiders returned to Allied lines, their vehicles were repeatedly attacked by Italian and German aircraft. While returning fire on 30 December, near "Marble Arch" (El Gaus; Arco dei Fileni), Lewes was reportedly hit in the thigh by a 20 mm cannon round and died at the scene of the attack.

=== Recognition ===
Lewes is commemorated on the Alamein Memorial.

== Personal life ==
At the time of his death, Lewes was engaged to marry Mirren Barford, an Oxford undergraduate. Their love letters were collected and published by Barford's son in 1995.

== In popular culture ==
Lewes was depicted by Alfie Allen in the 2022 television historical drama SAS: Rogue Heroes.
