= Eoin McGonigal =

British military officer

Eoin Christopher McGonigal
- Born: 5 December 1920; Dublin, Ireland
- Died: 18 November 1941 (aged 20); Libya
- Cause of death: Died in deployment
- Burial place: Libya Desert
- Relatives: Richard McGonigal (brother); Ambrose McGonigal (brother); Letty McGonigal (sister); Ina McGonigal (sister); Cattie McGonigal (sister); Peggy McGonigal (Sister)
- Military career
- Allegiance: United Kingdom
- Branch: British Army SAS
- Service years: 1939–1941
- Rank: Lieutenant
- Service number: 97290
- Units: Royal Ulster Rifles; No. 11 (Scottish) Commando; SAS
- Conflicts: Second World War; North African Campaign; Battle of the Litani River
- Memorials: Alamein Memorial

Eoin Christopher McGonigal (5 December 1920 – 18 November 1941) was an officer of the British Army and a founding member of the Special Air Service (SAS).

Before joining the Royal Ulster Rifles in 1939, he studied law at Trinity College Dublin. He later became a member of the No. 11 (Scottish) Commando before joining the Special Air Service along with his best friend, Paddy Mayne. He was killed after a parachute jump during Operation Squatter, an unsuccessful raid on forward Axis airfields in North Africa, in support of Operation Crusader.

== Personal life ==
Born in Dublin to John McGonigal and Margaret McGonigal, he was brought up in Belfast. He was the younger brother of Ambrose McGonigal, who later became a High Court Judge in Northern Ireland.

== In popular culture ==
McGonigal is portrayed by Dónal Finn in the BBC action drama SAS: Rogue Heroes.
