= Verrières, Vienne =

Verrières
- Commune
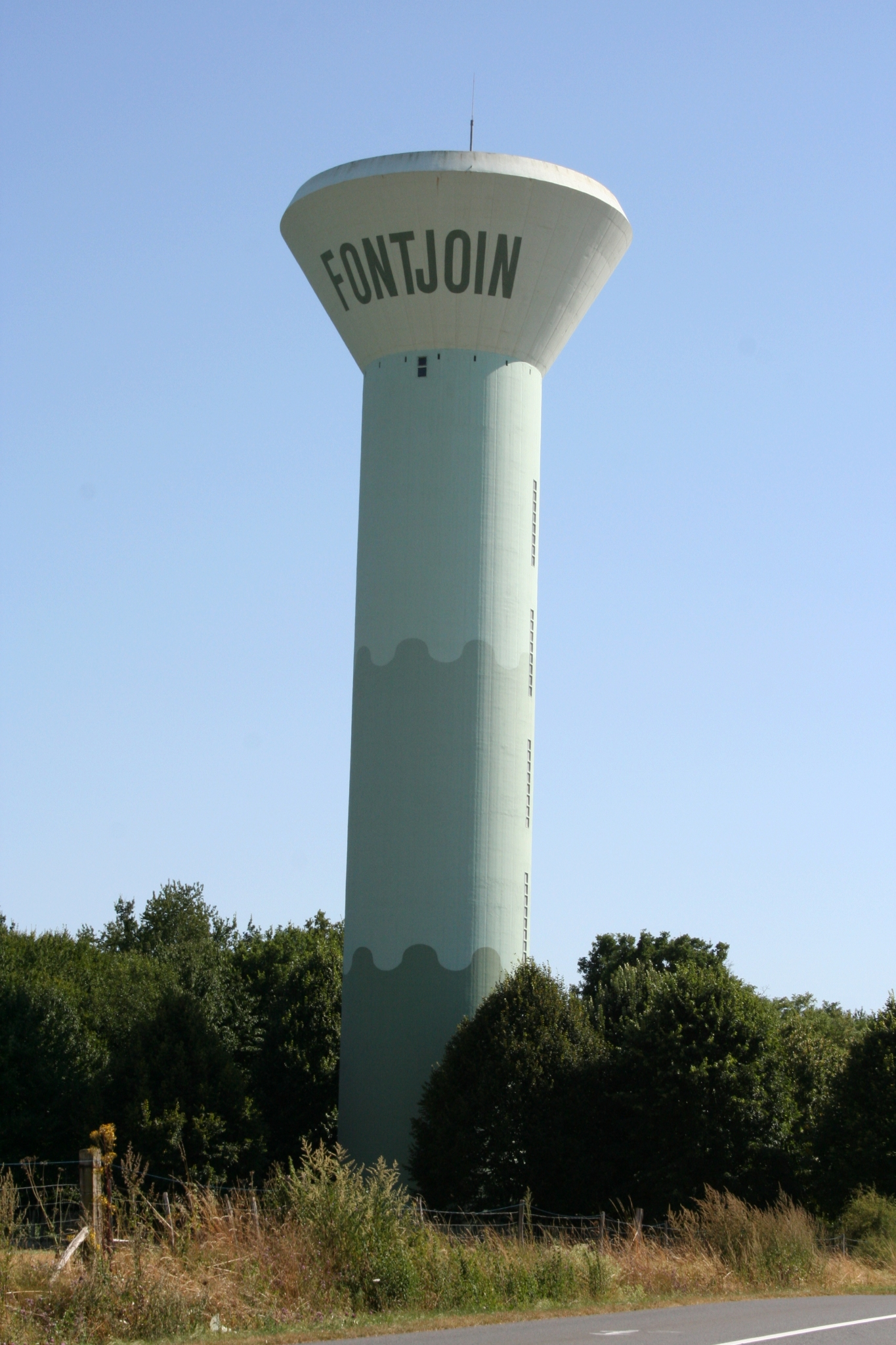
- The water tower in Verrières
- Location of Verrières
- Location within France Location within Nouvelle-Aquitaine
- Coordinates: 46°24′47″N 0°35′37″E
- Country: France
- Region: Nouvelle-Aquitaine
- Department: Vienne
- Arrondissement: Montmorillon
- Canton: Lussac-les-Châteaux
- Intercommunality: Vienne et Gartempe

Government
  - Mayor (2020–2026): Christophe Viaud
- Area^{1}: 19.58 km^{2} (7.56 sq mi)
- Elevation: 110 m (360 ft)
- Highest elevation: 151 m (495 ft)
- Lowest elevation: 97 m (318 ft)
- Population (2023): 921
  - Density: 47.0/km^{2} (122/sq mi)
- Time zone: UTC+01:00 (CET)
  - Summer (DST): UTC+02:00 (CEST)
- INSEE/Postal code: 86285 /86410
- ^{1} French Land Register data, which excludes lakes, ponds, glaciers > 1 km^{2} (0.386 sq mi or 247 acres) and river estuaries.

Verrières (French pronunciation: [vɛʁjɛʁ]) is a commune in the Vienne department in the Nouvelle-Aquitaine region in western France.

== See also ==
- Communes of the Vienne department
