= Mike Sadler =

British Army officer (1920–2024)

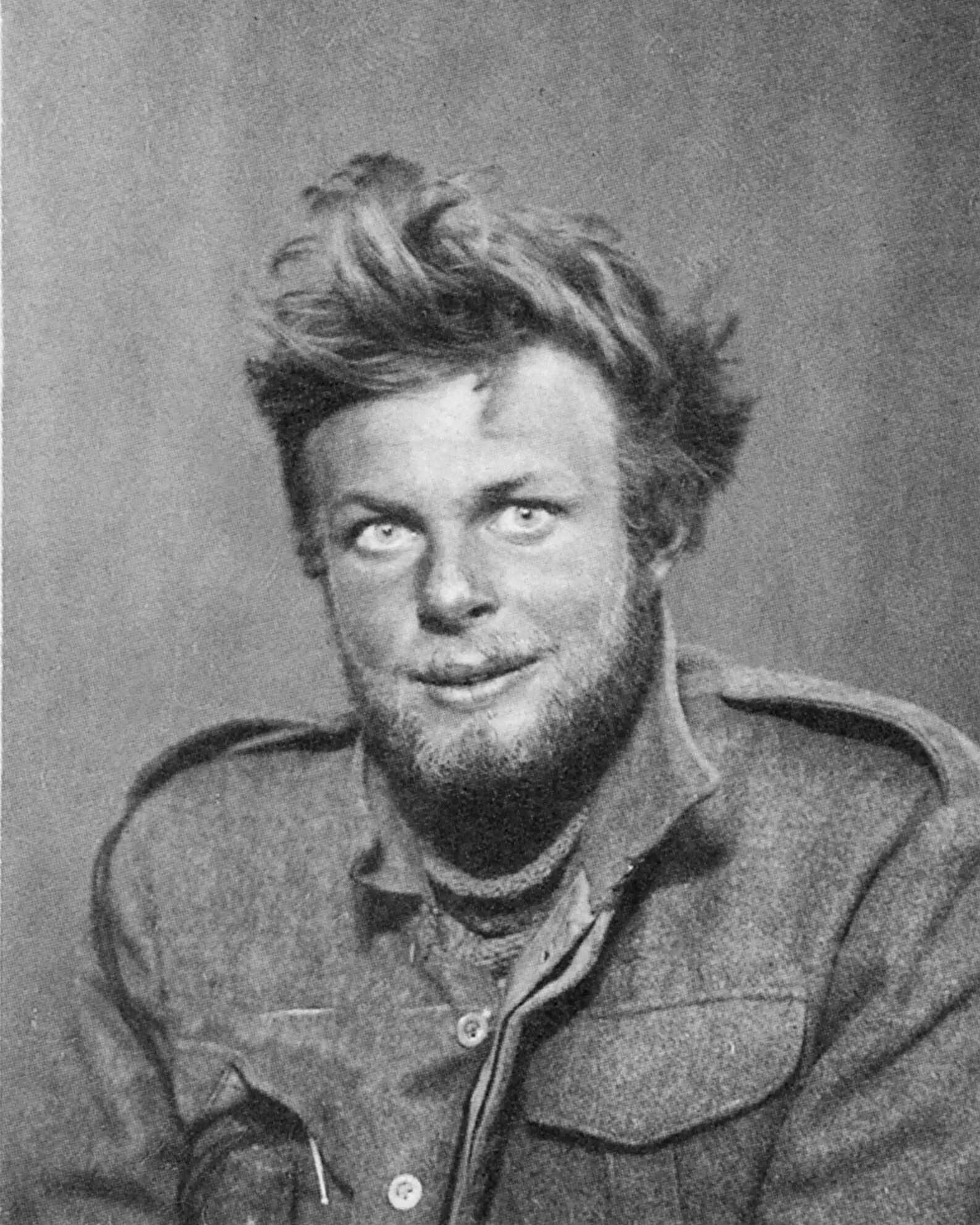
- Sadler in 1943
- Born: 22 February 1920; Kensington, London, England
- Died: 4 January 2024 (aged 103); Cambridge, Cambridgeshire, England
- Military career
- Allegiance: United Kingdom
- Branch: British Army
- Rank: Major
- Units: Special Air Service; Long Range Desert Group
- Conflicts: Second World War; Western Desert Campaign; Operation Bigamy; Western Front; Operation Houndsworth
- Awards: Military Cross; Military Medal; Polar Medal; Legion of Honour (France)

Willis Michael Sadler, MC, MM (22 February 1920 – 4 January 2024) was a British Army officer. He was the last original member of the Special Air Service and one of the last survivors of the Long Range Desert Group (survived by Jack Mann who also served in the LRDG).

== Early life ==
Willis Michael Sadler was born on 22 February 1920 in Kensington, London, England, to Adam and Wilma Sadler. When his father moved to Stroud, Gloucestershire, to manage a plastics factory, the family moved to the nearby village of Sheepscombe. Sadler attended Oakley Hall School in Cirencester and Bedales School in Petersfield, Hampshire, which he left in 1937.

== Military career ==
In 1937, Sadler moved to Southern Rhodesia (now Zimbabwe) to work on a tobacco farm. When the Second World War began in 1939, he enlisted in a Rhodesian regiment anti-tank unit of the British Army that would fight Erwin Rommel's Afrika Korps along the Egypt–Libya border. He was rapidly promoted to sergeant, though was later demoted after a disagreement with an officer.

While on leave in Cairo, Egypt, Sadler convinced members of the recently assembled Long Range Desert Group (LRDG) that he could serve as their truck convoys' celestial navigator. In this role, he guided Special Air Service (SAS) commandos across the Libyan Desert for nighttime raids on Axis airfields and bases. He used a theodolite to identify the group's position, even on the uneven terrain of sand dunes.

During his first assignment with the LRDG, Sadler navigated the SAS across more than 400 mi (643.74 km) of desert between the Jalo Oasis in Cyrenaica, Libya, and the Axis airfield in Tamet, Libya, enabling the British Army to destroy twenty-four aircraft and kill dozens of German and Italian pilots. Soon after, he was promoted to corporal and awarded the Military Medal.

In the July 1942 raid on the Sidi Haneish Airfield in Egypt, Sadler navigated eighteen jeeps, each armed with four Vickers K machine guns, to destroy thirty-seven German aircraft. However, during an attempted raid on Benghazi as part of Operation Bigamy in September 1942, the LRDG was unable to avoid Italian reconnaissance, resulting in the loss of seventy armed vehicles.

In January 1943, SAS founder David Stirling sought to lead a small group through the Tebaga Gap and meet with the British First Army for a push against Axis forces in Tunis, Tunisia. While Stirling and ten of the soldiers were captured by German forces, Sadler escaped with Johnny Cooper and Freddie Taxis, walking 110 mi (177 km) without food and water until they reached the French Foreign Legion and American 26th Infantry Regiment in Tozeur, Tunisia. Lieutenant Colonel John W. Bowen suspected the trio were German spies, but Sadler eventually negotiated his release to join the British Eighth Army for the remainder of the Western Desert campaign.

In early 1944, Sadler was stationed in Darvel, Scotland, to train SAS members for the June 1944 Normandy landings. In August 1944, he parachuted into France as part of Operation Houndsworth and was awarded the Military Cross for killing two German machine gun crews using an armed jeep behind enemy lines. In 2018, Sadler was made a Knight of the French Legion of Honour in a private ceremony held in the London Embassy of France in recognition of his service.

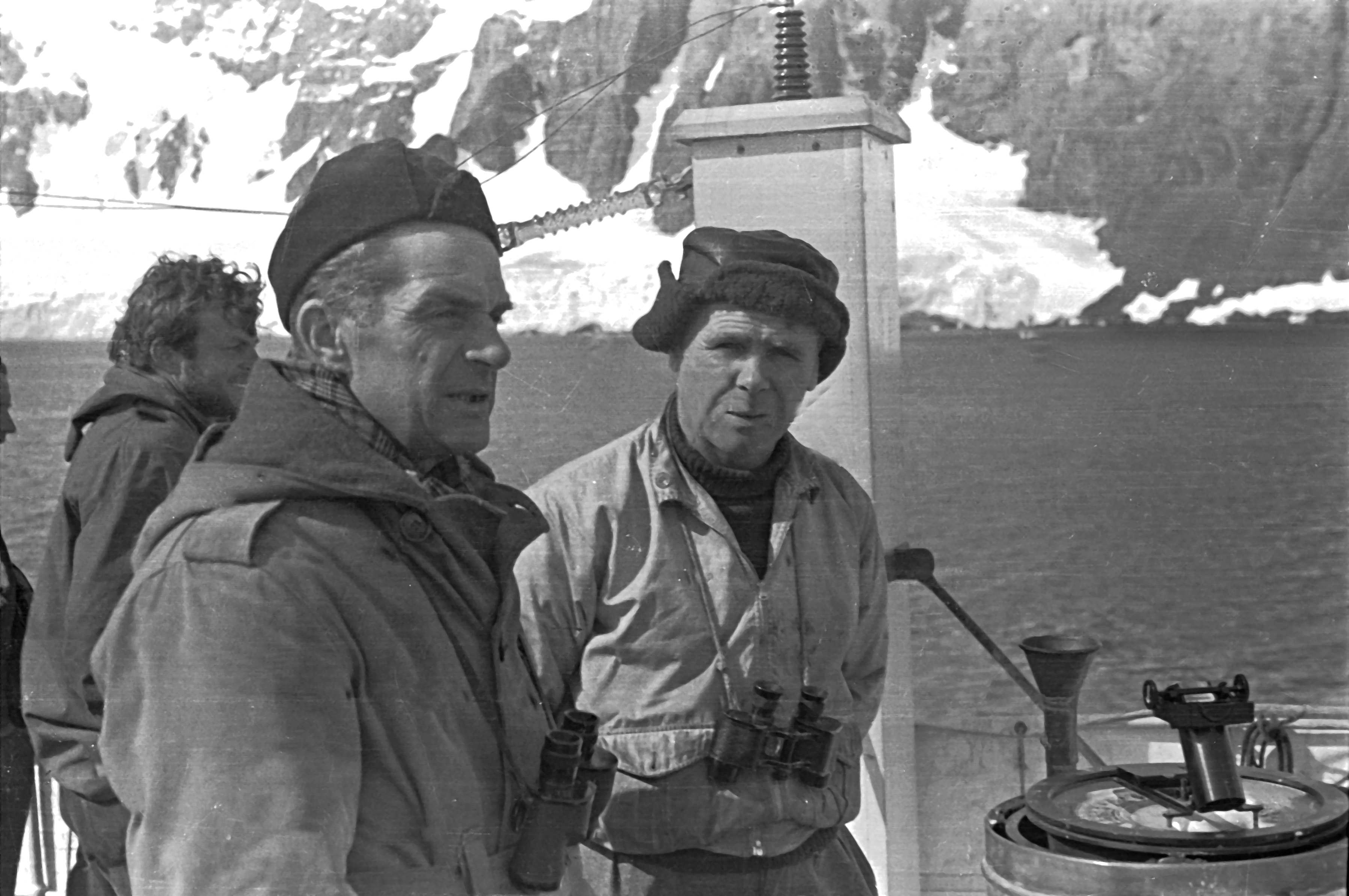
Mike Sadler (left) alongside Captain Robert Sheppard (centre) and Surgeon Commander Edward W. Bingham (right) aboard the MV Trepassey

After Stirling's capture, the SAS was led by Paddy Mayne until the end of the Second World War. When Mayne was recruited to the Falkland Islands Dependencies Survey, Sadler joined the crew of the MV Trepassey, led by Edward W. Bingham, on a British expedition to Antarctica. Sadler was awarded the Polar Medal for establishing a base on Stonington Island, which connected to the Antarctic mainland via a glacier. In 2021, the area vacated by the glacier's retreat was named "Sadler's Passage" in recognition of his work.

== Later years ==
After decades spent working for the Secret Intelligence Service (MI6), which included deception efforts during the Falklands War, Sadler retired and took up sailing. In 1990, he and former Director of the Royal Cruising Club Pilotage Foundation Oz Robinson (1926-2009) published the second edition of the nautical guidebook Atlantic Spain and Portugal.

== Personal life ==
In 1947, Sadler married Anne Hetherington, a member of the First Aid Nursing Yeomanry, but they divorced in 1949. In 1958, he married Patricia Benson through his work in the British Foreign Office as a member of the Secret Intelligence Service, and they had a daughter named Sally. Patricia Benson Sadler died in 2001.

After the Second World War, Sadler lived in Cheltenham, Gloucestershire. Despite losing his eyesight with age, he celebrated his 100th birthday with members of the Special Forces Club in London in 2020. He died on 4 January 2024 at the age of 103 in a nursing home in Cambridge, England.

== In popular culture ==
In 2013, Sean Rayment's Fighting Rommel: Captain Mike Sadler was published, part of his Tales from the Special Forces Club series of short stories.

In 2022, Tom Shankland directed SAS: Rogue Heroes, a historical drama television series about the Special Air Service's Western Desert Campaign during the Second World War based on Ben Macintyre's 2016 book of the same name. In the series, Sadler was portrayed by Tom Glynn-Carney.
