= List of SAS operations =

The following is a list of known Special Air Service (SAS) operations.

== Second World War Operations ==
The Special Air Service began life in July 1941, the brainchild of Lieutenant David Stirling of No. 8 (Guards) Commando. His idea was for small teams of parachute trained soldiers to operate behind enemy lines to gain intelligence, destroy enemy aircraft and attack their supply and reinforcement routes. The SAS carried out this role until the end of the war serving in a number of theatres and campaigns.

By the end of the Second World War on 8 May 1945, the SAS had suffered 330 casualties, but had killed or wounded 7,733 and captured 23,000 of their enemies.

=== North Africa ===
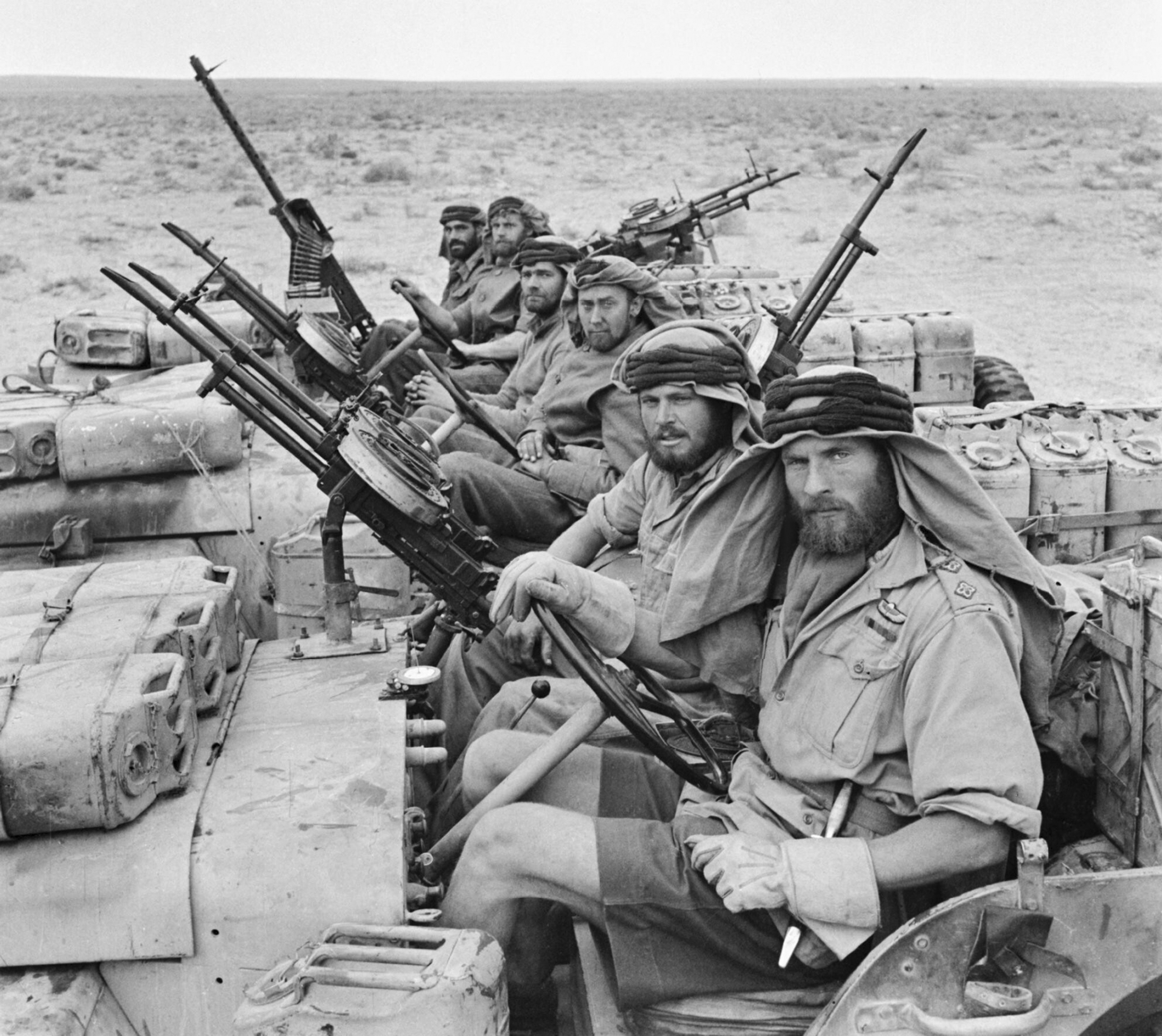
The SAS used purpose-outfitted jeeps in North Africa missions

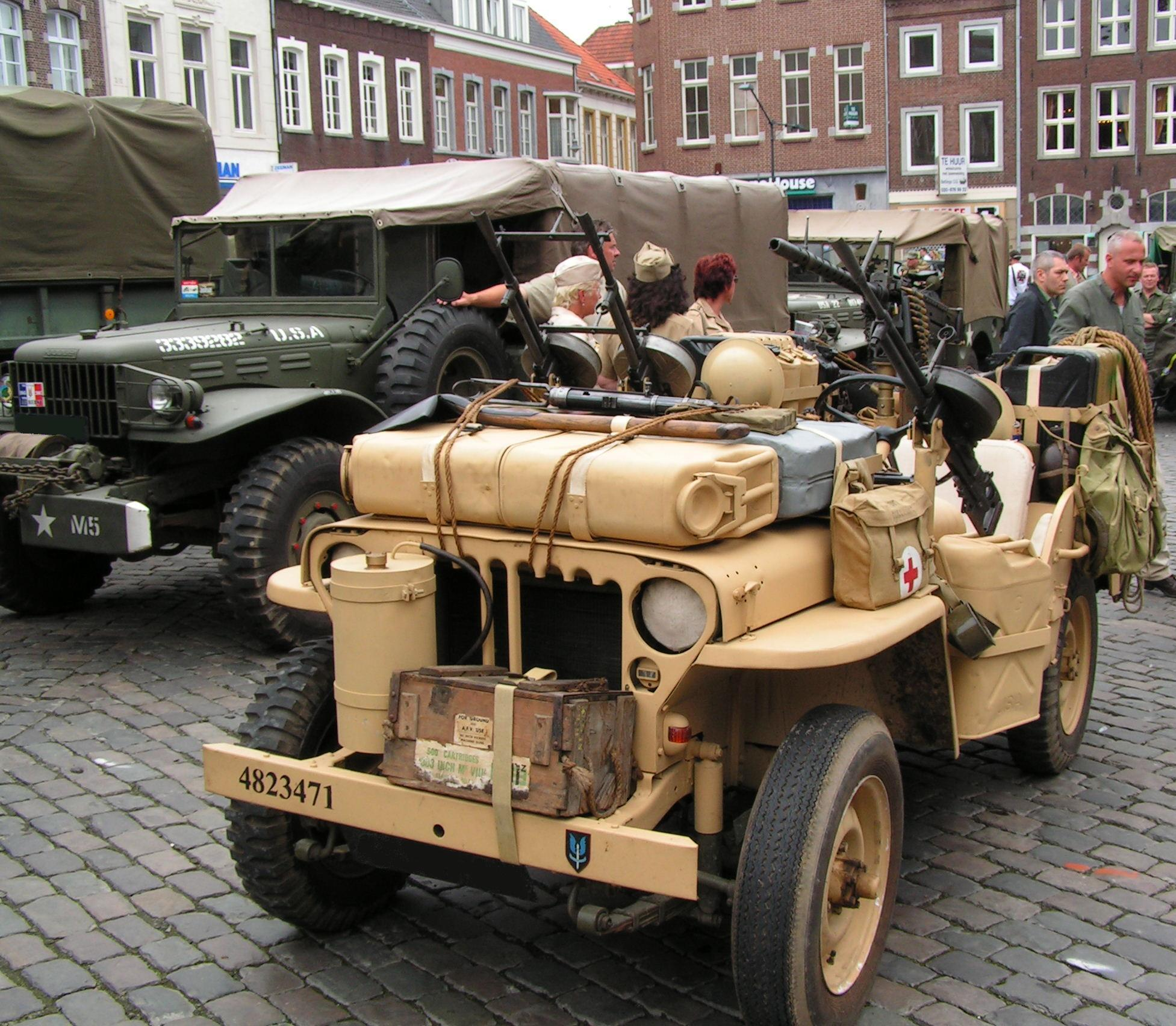
SAS prepared jeep, 2007 Santa Fé Event in Roermond, the Netherlands

- Operation Squatter, 16/17 November 1941, unsuccessful raid on forward Axis airfields in North Africa, in support of Operation Crusader
- Operation Green Room
- Operation Bigamy, September 1942, diversionary raid on the Port of Benghazi in support of Operation Agreement 13/14 September 1942
- Operation Palmyra

=== Mediterranean ===
- Operation Albumen, 7/8 June 1942, 4/5 July 1943, raids on Axis airfields in Crete
- Operation Chestnut, July 1943, raids supporting the Allied invasion of Sicily (also known as the Battle of Sicily and Operation Husky)
- Operation Narcissus, July 1943, capture of lighthouse in Sicily
- Operation Avalanche, Allied invasion of Italy
- Begonia/Jonquil, October 1943, rescue of POWs in Italy
- Operation Candytuft, October 1943, raid on railway targets in Italy
- Operation Maple Driftwood 1944, raid on railway targets in Italy
- Operation Baobab, January 1944, raid on rail targets serving Anzio, Italy
- Operation Galia, December 1944 – February 1945, 34 men from 3 Squadron, 2 SAS parachuted into northern Italy, conducted operations alongside local resistance fighters

=== Northwest Europe ===
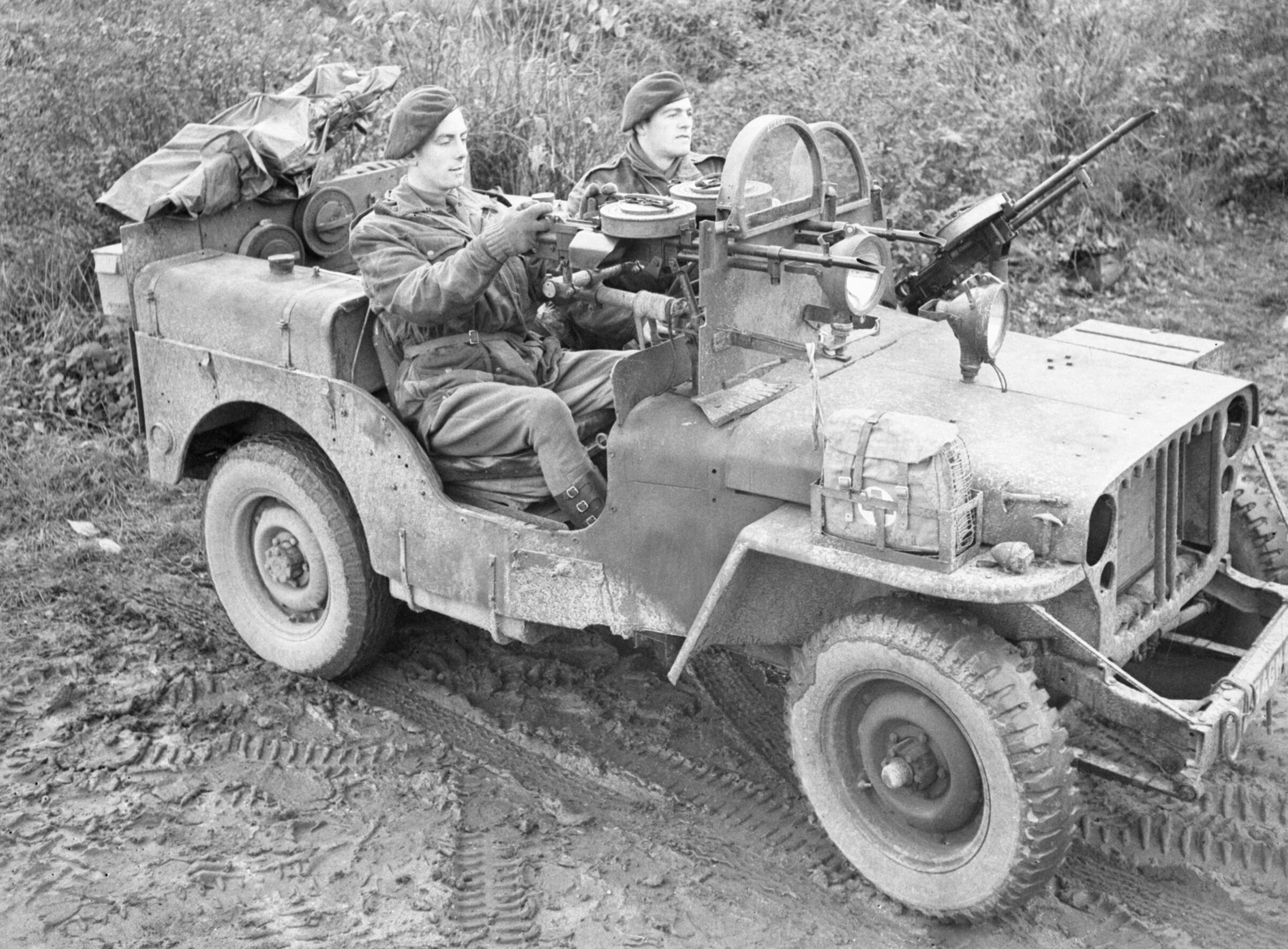
A specially outfitted jeep of 1 SAS near Geilenkirchen in Germany during Operation Clipper. The SAS were involved at this time in clearing snipers in the 43rd Wessex Division area.

The below operations were overseen by the brigade formation known as Special Air Service Troops:

- Operations in support of Operation Overlord, the Allied invasion of German-occupied France:
  - Operation Titanic, 6 June 1944.
  - Operation Nelson, June 1944, operation in the Orleans Gap.
  - Operation Samwest, 6 June 1944, 4th SAS Battalion (Free French) dropped in Côtes-du-Nord (Brittany) to hinder German troop movements
  - Operation Grog /Grog, 4 SAS in conjunction with Operations Dingson and Samwest 5 June 1944.
  - Operation Dingson, 6 June 1944, 4th SAS Battalion (Free French) dropped to Morbihan (Brittany).
  - Operation Bulbasket, 1st SAS mission, although partly successful operation 6 June 1944.
  - Operation Cooney, 8 June 1944, 18 teams of the 4th SAS Battalion (58 Free French) dropped to Brittany to break communications ways.
  - Operation Haft, 8 July to 11 August 1944
  - Operation Houndsworth, June 1944.
  - Operation Lost, 23 June – July 1944, British and Free French operation in Brittany.
  - Operation Swan II, 1944.
  - Operation Gain, 1944 (originally issued as Operation Cain but corrupted in transmission and the latter adopted).
  - Operation Defoe, July 1944, patrols in Normandy.
  - Operation Barker, 1944, (originally issued as Operation Barkers as it is named for a famous London department store, but subsequently truncated).
  - Operation Derry, 5/18 August 1944.
  - Operation Gaff, July 1944, attempt to kill or capture Erwin Rommel.
  - Operation Hardy I, 27 July to 19 August 1944, Raids near Dijon, France. Amalgamated into Operation Wallace.
  - Operation Wallace, 19 August to 19 September 1944, Raids near Dijon, France.
  - Operation Kipling, 13 August to 26 September 1944, conducted ambushes on German forces in the Orléans Gap.
  - Operation Dunhill, August 1944, raid in support of the breakout of American forces from the Normandy beachhead.
  - Operation Loyton, August 1944, operations near the Belfort Gap.
- Operation Pistol, September 1944, operations to blow railways south of Metz and east of Dieuze.
- Operation Moses, September 1944, Take over from the Bulbasket mission and aid the local French resistance forces.
- Operation Haggard, (part of a series of randomly allocated cryptonyms derived from famous writers).
- Operation Newton, August 1944, attacks on German rear areas.
- Operation Noah II 16 August/13 September 1944, attack on retreating Germans in Belgium.
- Operation Canuck, January 1945 operation in Northern Italy.
- Operation Cold Comfort, February 1945 failed SAS raid on railway targets near Verona.
- Operation Brake, (part of a series of operations named after parts of aircraft).
- Operation Tombola, March 1945, major operation around Bologna.
- Operation Archway, March 1945, reconnaissance in support of the crossing of the Rhine.
- Operation Amherst, In the night of 7 April 1945, more than 700 Free French SAS of the 3rd and 4th SAS were dropped in the Netherlands between Hoogeveen and Groningen.
- Operation Keystone, April 1945, operation near IJsselmeer.
- Operation Howard, April–May 1945, B and C Squadrons of 1 SAS, provided reconnaissance ahead of the Canadian 4th Armoured Division's drive towards northern Germany.

== Known Post war Operations ==
Immediately following the conclusion of the Second World War the SAS was disbanded; however the continued necessity for a commando unit was recognised and they were reformed again in 1947. In 1950 an SAS squadron trained to be deployed in the Korean War, however they were eventually transferred to Southeast Asia to serve in the ongoing Malayan Emergency.

The SAS continued to serve successfully in a variety of theatres and roles throughout the Cold War, and following the September 11 attacks the SAS deployed in the 2001 invasion of Afghanistan, it has continued its diverse selection of roles to the present day.

=== 1950s–1970s – the Cold War ===
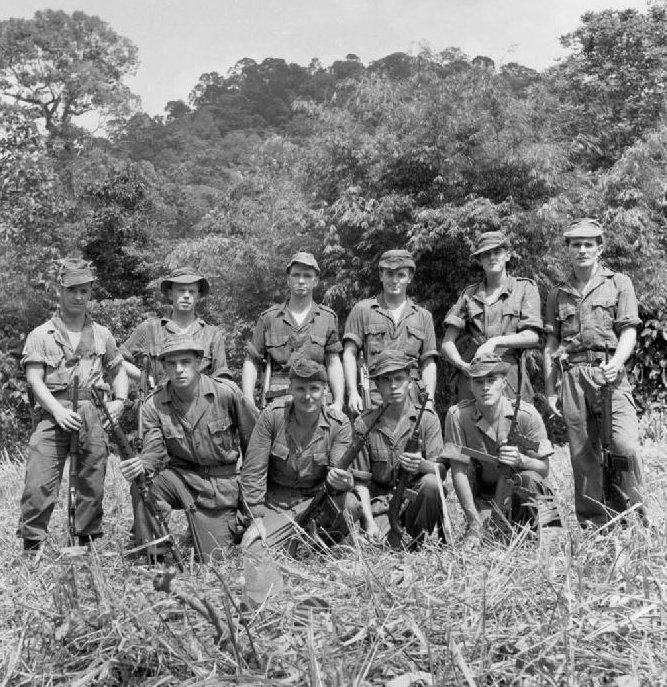
Men of 22 SAS in Malaya.

Malayan Emergency

- Operation Helsby, February 1952, series of deep penetration operations in Malaya.
- Operation Hive

Jebel Akhdar War

- In 1958 two squadrons of 22 SAS were deployed to Oman to put down a rebellion. In January 1959 the SAS carried out a successful assault on a large guerrilla force on the Sabrina plateau.

Dhofar rebellion

- Operation Jaguar in 1971
- Battle of Mirbat in 1972

Indonesian Confrontation

- Operation Claret, June 1964 – 1966, series of high risk cross-border patrols into Indonesia.

Aden Emergency

- "Keeni-Meeni Operations", 10 December 1963 – 1967, the search for Yemeni-trained assassins.

Lufthansa Flight 181

- Operation Feuerzauber (Fire Magic), 18 October 1977, supplemented German GSG9 commando operation.

=== 1980s–1990s ===
Iranian Embassy Siege

- Operation Nimrod, 5 May 1980, successful rescue of hostages from the Iranian embassy in London.

Falklands War

- Operation Corporate, 2 April–14 June 1982, the overall British operation to recover the Falkland Islands. The SAS alongside the SBS carried out numerous reconnaissance missions and diversionary raids in East and West Falkland to support the campaign. SAS forward observers also directed British artillery and aircraft.
  - Operation Paraquet, 25 April 1982, successful recapture of the Island of South Georgia.
  - Pebble Island Raid, 14–15 May 1982, successful attack on Argentinian-held airbase in West Falkland.
  - Operation Sutton, 21–23 May 1982, landings in East Falkland.
  - Operation Mikado, May 1982, abortive operation to destroy the three remaining Exocet missiles in Argentine possession.
  - Mount Kent, 29–31 May 1982, D Squadron of 22 SAS seized and then held the vital Mount Kent high ground for three nights against repeated Argentine assaults until being reinforced by 42 Commando.

The Troubles

- Operation Banner, 1969–1997, deployment of the British army in Northern Ireland, the official SAS deployment from 1976. See also: Timeline of British undercover forces in Operation Banner
  - Forkhill, 1976, senior IRA member Peter Cleary killed in struggle after capture by SAS.
  - Coagh, 1978.
  - Maghera, 1978, IRA members and an SAS unit exchange fire near Maghera, County Londonderry. One British soldier shot dead. A prominent IRA member, Francis Hughes, was wounded and captured following the shootout.
  - Derry, 1978, ambush of IRA member in Derry.
  - Belfast, 1978, ambush of three IRA members, one civilian also killed
  - Dunloy, 1978, ambush of teenage civilian mistaken for IRA member.
  - M60 gang, 1980, eight IRA members arrested, SAS Captain Herbert Westmacott killed.
  - Kesh ambush, 1984, ambush of four IRA members, two IRA members and one SAS soldier killed.
  - Strabane ambush, 1985, ambush of three IRA members
  - Roslea, 1986, ambush of two IRA members.
  - Operation Judy, 1987, ambush of eight IRA members.
  - Flavious, 1988, operation against three IRA members in Gibraltar.
  - Belfast, 1988, ambush of IRA unit as it attacked an RUC Station in Belfast, passing taxi driver killed.
  - Drumnakilly, 1988, military confrontation that took place at Drumnakilly in County Tyrone.
  - Loughgall, 1990, ambush of two IRA members.
  - Strabane, 1990, ambush of INLA members, one killed.
  - Coagh, 1991, ambush of three IRA members.
  - Clonoe, 1992, ambush of six IRA members.
  - Coalisland, 1997, one alleged IRA member shot and wounded after a grenade attack on RUC barracks.
  - South Armagh Sniper, 1997, the SAS captured one of two IRA sniper teams employing .50 BMG calibre Barrett M82 and M90 rifles.

Persian Gulf War

- Operation Granby, January 1991, the deployment British forces during the Persian Gulf War. The SAS adopted its classic deep penetration role behind enemy lines, being deployed in numerous reconnaissance missions and raids on Scud launchers and communications sites. They also acted as observers for Coalition artillery and aircraft.
  - Bravo Two Zero, the task was to find and destroy Iraqi Scud missile launchers along a 250 km stretch of the MSR. The patrol was compromised which lead to contact with Iraqi Forces, eventually the 8 man SAS patrol withdrew and began trying to escape and evade the Iraqi forces. Unfortunately 3 members died, 4 were captured and 1 successfully managed to escape alone.
  - Operation Victor Two, February 1991, a successful assault on a Scud communications installation.

Bosnian War

- Operation Joint Endeavor, 16 July 1992 – 2 December 2004, NATO intervention in Bosnia and Herzegovina.
  - Operation Tango, 10 July 1997, the arrest of two suspected war criminals in Prijedor. The men were wanted for involvement in the ethnic cleansing of Bosnian Muslims.
  - Operation Ensue, November 1998, the arrest of a Serbian War criminal.

Japanese embassy hostage crisis

- Operation Chavín de Huántar, 22 April 1997, supplemented Peruvian Army operation.

Sierra Leone Civil War

- Operation Palliser, May 2000, deployment of British forces in Sierra Leone.
  - Operation Barras, 10 September 2000, joint SAS/SBS rescue of 6 captured members of the Royal Irish Regiment in Sierra Leone.

2001 insurgency in Macedonia

- Operation Essential Harvest, 27 August 2001 SAS were assisted by Pathfinder Platoon in marking out National Liberation Army positions.

=== 2000s–2010s – The War on Terror ===
War in Afghanistan

- Operation Enduring Freedom– Afghanistan , 7 October 2001 – 28 December 2014, NATO deployment in Afghanistan. The SAS were involved in the initial invasion and remained active in the conflict.
  - Operation Determine, October 2001, A and G squadron of 22 SAS, reinforced by members of the Territorial SAS, conducted reconnaissance tasks in north west Afghanistan none of which resulted in enemy contact.
  - Operation Trent, November 2001, A and G squadron of 22 SAS, attacked an Al Qaeda opium plant and command centre 250 miles southwest of Kandahar, the operation was a success, but 4 SAS soldiers were wounded.
  - Operation Moshtarak, March 2010, as part of a U.S.-led operation in Helmand Province, operating with Navy SEALs striking against and capturing Taliban leaders.
  - Operation Jubilee, 28 May 2012, a team from the SAS and DEVGRU conducted Operation Jubilee to rescue 4 aid workers (1 British, 1 Kenyan, 2 Afghan) captured by bandits and held in two separate caves in the Koh-e-Laram forest, Badakhshan Province. The SAS and SEALs arrived by Blackhawk helicopters from the 160th SOAR at an LZ 2 km away and travelled on foot to the caves where the hostages were being held. The SAS and SEALs stormed the caves simultaneously – DEVGRU killed 7 bandits but didn't find any hostages, the SAS killed 4 bandits and recovered all 4 hostages, there were no casualties to hostages or rescuers.
- Operation Toral, in December 2015, it was reported that 30 members of the SAS alongside 60 US special forces operators joined the Afghan Army in the Battle to retake parts of Sangin from Taliban insurgents.

Iraq War

- Operation Telic, 19 March 2003 – 30 April 2009, the British deployment in Iraq. The SAS were involved in the 2003 Invasion of Iraq (they were designated as Task Force 14) and they were involved in later operations during the occupation.
  - Operation Row, 17 March 2003, was Britain's contribution to the taking of large parts of western and northern Iraq, this would pin down several Iraqi divisions stopping Saddam Hussein reinforcing his efforts against the main invasion. B and D squadron infiltrated Iraq (B by ground vehicles and D by air), a few members of D Squadron were deployed to southern Iraq to support the coalition advance on Basra, the team conducted forward route reconnaissance and infiltrated the city and brought in strikes on the Ba'athist loyalist leadership. After capturing H-2 and H-3 air bases, the British and Australian SAS teams moved to their next objective – the intersection of the two main highways linking Baghdad with Syria and Jordan, securing Highway 2 and 4. The SAS lost not a single soldier during the taking of Iraq, although two members of D Squadron had died in a training accident before the invasion. Later the SAS operated out of Baghdad International Airport; the force accompanied MI6 officers into Baghdad so they could carry out missions with security, by early May, B and D Squadrons were replaced roughly 30 members of G Squadron, who still had about a dozen members deployed in Afghanistan.
    - Assault on suspected WMD facility in al-Qa'im, 17 March 2003, two days before the Coalition invasion, the majority of B & D Squadrons 22 SAS were tasked to assault a suspected chemical munitions site at a water-treatment plant in the city of al-Qa'im. It's been reported that the site might have been a SCUD launch site or a depot, an SAS officer was quoted by author Mark Nicol as saying "it was a location where missiles had been fired at Israel in the past, and a site of strategic importance for WMD material." D squadron, along with their 'Pinkie' DPVs (the last time the vehicles were used before their retirement), was flown 120 km into Iraq in 6 CH-47s in 3 waves. Following their insertion, D squadron established a patrol laager at a remote location outside al-Qa'im and awaited the arrival of B squadron, who had driven overland from Jordan. Their approach to the plant was compromised, and a firefight developed which ended in one 'pinkie' having to be abandoned and destroyed, repeated attempts to assault the plant were halted, leading the SAS calling in an air strike which finally silenced the opposition.
    - Seizure of H-2 and H-3 Air Bases, 18 and 25 March 2003, after infiltrating Iraq at full strength, a combined force consisting of B and D squadron of British Special Air Service and 1 squadron of Australian Special Air Service Regiment set up observation posts around H-2 and H-3 air base and called in airstrikes that defeated the Iraqi defenders, the combined British and Australian Squadrons took H-2 virtually unopposed. H-3 airbase was defended by a battalion of Iraqi troops and significant numbers of mobile and static anti aircraft guns, the British and Australian SAS were joined by members of Delta Force and on 24 March by Green Beret ODAs from Bravo company, 1st Battalion 5th SFG, together they called in constant 24 hours of precision airstrikes on H-3 forcing the Iraqi defenders to flee, the Coalition SOF secured H-3 and seized around 80 assorted anti aircraft cannon guns and an enormous amount of ammunition. A company of Rangers and Royal Marines from 45 Commando flew from Jordan to reinforce the air bases. The British SAS then headed eastwards to search for and destroy Iraqi SCUD missile launchers – which Saddam might again use to attack Israel.
  - Capture of Lieutenant-General Abid Hamid Mahmud al-Tikriti, On the night of 16 June 2003, members of G Squadron SAS and B squadron Delta Force captured Saddam Hussein's personal secretary who was ranked fourth most important HVT (High Valued Target) in Tikrit, where British intelligence had traced him to. He was captured in a joint helicopter and ground assault without resistance or casualties and was considered a highly successful operation.
  - Operation Jocal, on 24 June 2003, six Royal Military Police soldiers from 156 Provost Company of the 16 Air Assault Brigade were assaulted and killed by an Iraqi mob numbering several hundred at a police station in Majar al-Kabir. The town was known for banditry and lawlessness, the people there insisted that they had liberated themselves from Ba'athist party occupation and did not want coalition troops there, British tactics in sweeping for weapons angered the population. Some of the soldiers were shot and others beaten to death. A couple of days after the incident, members of the G squadron arrived in the town to conduct Operation Jocal to find those responsible, they then gathered intelligence on who was responsible and withdrew from the town under fire by armed Iraqis, however British military commanders discouraged the SAS from going back in and arresting those responsible.
  - Operation Paradoxical, was authorised in the summer of 2003 and lasted until winter of that year when the SAS were placed under the command of the Chief of Joint Operations in Northwood. The broadly drawn operation was for the SAS to hunt down threats to the coalition, it also gave them greater latitude to work with US "classified" forces prosecuting the best available intelligence. They are known to have operated covertly in Ramadi and Fallujah in October and November 2003 and other more remote parts of Al Anbar Province. In A Squadrons four-month deployment in 2003 they carried out 85 missions. one mission, in late November, soldiers from A Squadron SAS launched a heliborne assault on a remote farm in Al Anbar province, after they came under fire from insurgents inside, air support was called in and hit the farm, after it was cleared; seven dead insurgents were found whom American intelligence believed were foreign fighters.
    - Operation Abalone, on the night of 31 October 2003, two dozen members of A Squadron (G Squadron left Iraq in August) with Delta Force, supported by a platoon of US M2A3 Bradley IFV's manning an outer cordon, assaulted four compounds/dwellings on the outskirts of Ramadi where US intelligence had tracked a Sudanese jihadist who was facilitating Islamist militants into Iraq. The SAS were tasked with assaulting 2 of the dwellings whilst Delta Force assaulted another 2 dwellings; both of Delta's and one of the SAS's target buildings were cleared without incident, but as the SAS assaulted their final dwelling the assault team were wounded by a hail of fire and an RPG-7 rocket, they returned fire and withdrew from the building. After a head count, it was realised that 2 soldiers were still in the building (one had been killed and another, an SAS Corporal, was wounded), A squadron's CO and several soldiers moved to the roof of another building from which they could fire onto the target building, whilst several soldiers re-entered the building to find the 2 missing personnel. After finding the body of one soldier and recovering the wounded Corporal under fire, Bradley IFV's 'pummelled' the dwelling with its armaments and then Delta force assaulted it, killing several terrorists; whilst the SAS assaulted another house that they were receiving fire from, killing 1 and capturing 4 foreign insurgents. The operation was brought to a successful conclusion, the more seriously wounded SAS soldiers were medevaced and as the SAS and Delta Force collapsed back to their cordon, they received small arms fire from the neighbourhood. Although they did not find the Sudanese jihadist, he's believed to have been killed with a dozen other insurgents; the soldier killed – Corporal Ian Plank, who had been attached to A Squadron from the SBS, was the first UKSF combat fatality in the Iraq War. The Operation turned up actual proof of an internationalist jihadist movement.
  - 2005 Royal Air Force Hercules shootdown, 2005, Iraqi insurgents shot down an RAF Hercules flying out of Baghdad in January 2005, in response to this G Squadron of the 22nd SAS Regiment immediately began hunting down the insurgents responsible, after a long intelligence operation that led to operations later in that year the SAS captured some of those responsible.
  - Task Force Black/Knight, 2004–2008, the new UKSF mission and deployment was codenamed Operation Crichton, a title that would remain in use until 2009 and the new UKSF codename for them in Iraq was known as "Task Force Black". An SAS team worked jointly with American Delta Force in a secret war against Al Qaeda and other insurgents based in Iraq. The Task Force size was roughly around 150 personnel and their "Black Ops" operation claimed to have cleared 3,500 insurgents off the streets with "several hundred" of them believed to have been killed. 6 SAS soldiers had also been killed and 30 injured in the Operation. General Stanley McChrystal, the American commander of NATO forces in Iraq, commented that A Squadron 22 SAS Regiment, when part of Task Force Black and Task Force Knight, carried out 175 combat missions during a six-month tour of duty. In the early months of 2004, the SAS used their capabilities in reconnaissance and surveillance to watch suspects and develop/gather intelligence for the coalition intelligence services. The SAS operational process in Baghdad was known as find-fix-finish, working backwards with the 'finish' part being a raid to take down a suspect, 'fix' involved pinpointing a time and place which a target can be taken and 'find' would be finding the insurgent/terrorist. In February 2004, they almost captured/killed Abu Musab al-Zarqawi the leader of AQI when they assaulted a house in Baghdad; after forcing entry they withdrew when they discovered a booby trap, they still managed to overwhelm the occupants of the building and captured intelligence revealed Zarqawi had left a short time before. By autumn 2004, Task Force Black were operating in a 'semi detached way'; due to senior British officials taking issues with mistreatment and poor quality cells at JSOCs detention facility at Balad (handing over to regular US Army units rather than sending them to Balad), the deportation of detainees captured in Operation Aston etc. that JSOC had no other choice but to unconsciously end UK-US cooperation in special operations in Iraq – given the importance of rapidly exploiting intelligence. On 11 April 2005, G squadron, SAS captured Fadhil Ibrahim al-Mashhadani, one of Saddam Hussein's former apparatchik after assaulting a farm north-east of Baghdad that intelligence had traced him to. At about the same time, in an attempt to find the kidnappers of a foreigner, the SAS also captured a former senior Ba'athist party official and another man, they didn't find the hostage but the men were definitely connected to the kidnappers, however they were later released when US intelligence revealed that they were CIA assets. Due to the Basra Prison incident in which the name of the UKSF forces in Iraq 'Task force Black' was leaked to the press; the force was renamed 'Task force Knight' During the Spring and summer of 2007 the SAS suffered several men seriously wounded as it extended its operations into Sadr City. With Al-Qaeda surging in April 2007, Delta Force and Task Force Knight (in particular A squadron 22nd SAS) began conducting operations in Baghdad nearly every night. They also focused operations on takedowns of Shia and Sunni militants as well as Al-Qaeda bomb makers in May and June 2007, between May and November A squadron arrested 338 people and killed 88.
    - Operation Aston, February 2004, personnel from B Squadron of 22 SAS, assaulted a house in southern Baghdad that MI6 intelligence showed was part of a 'jihadist pipeline' from Iran to Iraq that American and British intelligence agencies were tracking suspects on and these suspects fell in with a jihadist group. Just before the SAS assaulted the house they were compromised by locals and a firefight with the jihadist ensued, the SAS pressed on and assaulted the house, as soon as they broke in a jihadist fired his AK-47 lightly wounding one SAS Sergeant. After a short-range firefight, the building was secured, killing two and capturing two foreign jihadist, the two captured jihadist were from LeT. Both terrorists captured were from/originated from Pakistan and were flown out of Iraq for interrogation at the US facility at Bagram Air base, this strained relations between the US and UK, (unknown to the British, there were no interrogators in Iraq that had the linguistic skills to screen the detainees) this in combination with the Abu Ghraib torture and prisoner abuse and the media reports about the First Battle of Fallujah, the government decided that they could no longer hand over detainees to JSOC if they were going to be flown elsewhere.
    - Operation Marlborough, 23 July 2005, members of G squadron 22 SAS, supported the SBS operation that killed 3 AQI would-be suicide bombers in Baghdad.
    - Christian Peacemaker hostage crisis, B squadron 22 SAS (along with a small team from JTF2) led an operation as part of Task Force Black to free British and Canadian peace activists in Baghdad who had been taken hostage in late November 2005 (one hostage was eventually murdered). The release effort was part of Operation Lightwater: the intelligence agencies and SAS initiated the operation with the aim of finding the hostages: which involved raiding houses and arresting suspects almost every day and night. The total number of building raids amounted to 50, (44 of them being conducted British special forces which in total detained 47 people). In the early hours of 23 March 2006, as part of Operation Lightwater, the SAS carried out Operation Ney 3: their target was a house in Mishahda, 20 miles northwest of Baghdad, they found two men they were looking for that revealed the location of the hostages in western Baghdad. At 0800, the SAS stormed the house, finding the insurgents had abandoned the building the SAS rescued the hostages.
  - Operation Traction, mid-January 2006, was the SAS upgrade into JSOC, they deployed TGHG (Task Group Headquarters Group): this included senior officers and other senior members of 22 SAS - to JSOCs base at Balad. This was the first deployment of TGHG to Iraq since the invasion of Iraq in 2003, the upgrade now meant that the SAS were "joined at the hip" with JSOC and it gave the SAS a pivotal role against Sunni militant groups, particularly AQI.
    - Operation Larchwood 4, 16 April 2006, that night, soldiers from B squadron and a platoon of British paratroopers from the SFSG/Task Force Maroon launched the operation that was aimed at mid-level Al-Qaeda leadership, it had been developed out of raids carried out on previous days by Delta Force and the SAS against AQI in the outskirts of Baghdad, killing at least 7 insurgents. B squadron inserted by helicopter and assaulted the terrorist-occupied farmhouse on the outskirts of Yusufiyah whilst the paratroopers set up a cordon, soon after entering the house a firefight broke out and 3 SAS soldiers were wounded by gunfire, the SAS regrouped and continued to assault the house but two more were wounded. However the SAS overcame this setback and took the house and the combined force killed a total of 5 terrorists and captured five men and several women and children, it also gathered valuable intelligence on Al Qaeda in Iraq including its leader.
    - On 15 April 2007, G squadron of the SAS assaulted a house near Taji containing a suspected Sunni insurgent leader in the early hours, whilst inserting by helicopter two RAF Pumas collided, two SAS personnel and an RAF crewman were thrown from one of the Puma and crushed by it as it rolled onto its side, two died but one SAS soldier was saved, several others were wounded by flying debris.
    - On 6 September 2007, a 30-man SAS team from A squadron, supported by paras from Task Force Maroon part of Task Force Black assaulted a house in Baghdad that intel had pinpointed as the location of a senior Al-Qaeda figure and/or a Sunni group. The mission was a success with at least one insurgent killed, but it cost the life of one of the SAS servicemen; Sergeant Eddie Collins.
    - On 20 November 2007, A squadron, backed up by paras, attacked Sunni insurgents in Salman Pak from RAF Puma and Lynx helicopters, after engaging them from the air one Puma began inserting its SAS team when it crashed which trapped and killed two SAS men.
    - In early 2008, B Squadron of TF Knight performed a nighttime parachute assault into Anbar province from a C-130, their target was a man counterfeiting dollar bills for Al-Qaeda, after landing they assaulted the targets house and "got" their target.
    - On 26 March 2008, B Squadron were once again called upon to hit a terrorist bomb makers house in Tikrit at 0200, after trying to call him out and sending in a Combat Assault dog – receiving no response, they stormed the house, they received a hail of fire and one SAS soldier, Sergeant Nick Brown was killed and four more SAS personnel were wounded. An orbiting AC-130 fired on the house as the assault team withdrew from the house, grenades were thrown at them and gunmen from another building joined in the firefight until a circling helicopter destroyed most of the building with its rockets. With Helicopter support, they pressed on and the SAS chased their 2 targets into another house who used civilians as hostages who were then accidentally killed beside the terrorists by the AC-130.
  - Operation Hathor, The SAS maintained a detachment in southern Iraq called Operation Hathor: that consisted of a handful of personnel based with British forces in Basra. Their primary role was to protect SIS (MI6) officers and to conduct surveillance and reconnaissance for the British Battle Group.
    - Basra prison incident, 2005, two undercover Special Air Service soldiers who were operating in Basra as part of Operation Hathor were captured by Iraqi police after it was alleged they opened fire on a police check point. The British army used tanks to encircle the prison they were being held at and after nightfall members of A Squadron SAS stormed the house the prisoners had been moved to and rescued the captured operatives. According to the governor of Basra province, Mohammed al-Waili, the British had used "more than ten tanks backed by helicopters" to carry out the raid. After the British army left, around 150 other prisoners fled the prison. On 25 December 2006, the SAS again raided the Al Jameat station, killing seven gunmen and freeing 127 prisoners being held by Shia militias there. They then blew up the building. A British Army spokesperson stated that the 127 prisoners freed had been tortured and that there were fears that they were about to be executed.
    - On 17 July 2006, Hathor detachment spearheaded the mission that resulted in British troops from the Brigade Reconnaissance Company of 20th Armoured Brigade capturing Sajjad Badr Adal Sayeed, the leader of the Mahdi Army, in a raid on a building in Basra. Mahdi Army militia soon engaged the strike force cordon with assault rifles and RPGs, the engagement lasted for 2 hours resulting in 1 British soldier killed and at least 4 militiaman killed.
    - In September 2006, Hathor detachment carried out a raid on the residence of an important member of Al Qaeda international network called Omar al-Faruq in Basra, following an intelligence tip off. Faruq opened fire on the assault force and was killed, the operation was an intelligence coup and underlined the value of the detachment.
    - In November 2006, during an assault on a building block occupied by insurgents in Basra by 'Hathor' detachment, Sergeant Jon Hollingsworth of D squadron who had been detached to 'Hathor' was leading his team when he was shot and he died of his wound not long afterwards.
    - Operation Dover, December 2006, a team from G Squadron stormed a building in northern Basra and apprehended an insurgent cell and its leader whom were responsible for carrying a bomb attack on the Shatt al-Arab waterway in Basra in November that killed 2 soldiers and 2 Royal Marines, video of the attack and other intelligence was gathered.
  - Operation Traction 2, early 2007, was part of a drive by JSOC to target Shia militants particularly in the southern Iraq. G squadron was deployed to Basra in mid-March 2007 and 'Hathor detachment was upgraded and renamed 'Task Force Spartan'. They immediately began gathering intelligence and on the night of 20 March 2007 G squadron raided a house in Basra containing Qais Khazali; a senior Shia militant and an Iranian proxy, and Laith al-Khazali and Ali Mussa Daqduq, a Hezbollah advisor, without casualties. The raid turned out to be most significant raid conducted by British forces in Iraq, gaining valuable intelligence on Iranian involvement in the Shia insurgency, including the Karbala raid. 'Task Force Spartan' was disbanded when British forces pulled out of Basra in 2007.

Operation Enduring Freedom – Horn of Africa

- Members of the SAS and the SRR were deployed to Djibouti as part of Combined Joint Task Force – Horn of Africa to conducting operations against Islamist terrorists in Somalia; they have carrying out surveillance missions of Britons believed to be travelling to Somalia for terrorist training and they are also working with US counterparts observing and "targeting" local terror suspects. They have also been carrying out a similar role in Yemen.

Libyan Civil War

- 2011 military intervention in Libya, an early operation was conducted by E Squadron, this was to contact the Libyan rebel and opposition leaders, however the mission was a failure after the team was captured and held prisoner for 72 hours by Libyan rebels.
  - Operation Ellamy, a BBC news broadcast on 19 Jan 2012 revealed that the SAS had, in fact been redeployed to Libya as part of the larger British deployment, in a joint operation with French and Qatari special forces. A troop of 20 personnel from D Squadron 22 SAS were in the East of Libya, operating in small groups in places like Misrata and Brega by August. They assisted in training, coordinating and commanding opposition groups on and off the front line, and they were very active directing NATO airstrikes. It was also alleged that 22 SAS were leading the hunt for Gaddafi after the Battle of Tripoli.

Military intervention against the Islamic State of Iraq and the Levant

- Operation Shader, In August 2014, the SAS were reported to be on the ground gathering intelligence and helping with the evacuation of Yazidi refugees from the Sinjar mountains At least one full squadron have been deployed to Iraq.and have reportedly been helping Kurdish forces in northern Iraq. Sources say that SAS and US Special Forces fought alongside Kurdish forces during Siege of Kobane in Syria.
  - May 2015 U.S. special forces raid in Syria, On 15 May after surveillance by the SAS who confirmed the presence of a senior leader of ISIL/ISIS named Abu Sayyaf in al-Amr in Deir Ezzor, who was then killed in a US Special forces raid.

== See also ==
- History of the Special Air Service

== Bibliography ==
- de B. Taillon, J. Paul (2000). The evolution of special forces in counter-terrorism, The British and American Experiences. Greenwood. ISBN 0-275-96922-3.
- Ryan, Mike (2003). Secret Operations of the SAS. Motorbooks International. ISBN 0-7603-1414-4.
- Shortt, James; McBride, Angus (1981). The Special Air Service. Osprey Publishing. ISBN 0-85045-396-8.
- Thompson, Leroy (1994). SAS: Great Britain's Elite Special Air Service. Motorbooks International. ISBN 0-87938-940-0.
- Mark, Urban (2012). Task Force Black: The Explosive True Story of the Secret Special Forces War in Iraq. St. Martin's Griffin. ISBN 978-1-250-00696-7.
