= Operation Haft =

- Part of Operation Overlord, in the Second World War
- Location: Mayenne, France
- Date: 8 July to 11 August 1944
- Executed by: United Kingdom; Free France
- Outcome: Allied victory: Heavy German casualties from allied air attacks
- Casualties: None

Operation Haft was a British special forces operation by the 1st Special Air Service that took place between 8 July to 11 August 1944 in the Mayenne area near Le Mans in the north-western part of German-occupied France. The operation was part of the much bigger Operation Overlord; the small team of seven men directed allied Air attacks on German troop and tank concentrations reinforcing the Normandy front line which contributed to heavy Germans casualties. The operation was a classed as a big success given the small numbers of the unit deployed.

== Background ==
In May 1944 the Supreme Headquarters Allied Expeditionary Force (SHAEF) had issued an order for the Special Air Service Brigade to carry out operations in France. They were to undertake parachute operations behind German lines, with assistance from the French resistance. The focus of these would be the disruption of German reinforcements from the south of France to the Normandy beachheads. A number of offensive operations were planned Bulbasket, Wallace, Hardy, Kipling and Houndsworth. In addition two small operations were planned purely for reconnaissance and information gathering. One was Defoe and the other Haft the latter of which was to operate in the area of Mayenne and Le Mans of north-western France.

Haft was to be a small team of seven men led by Captain Mike Blackman. The rest were radio operator John Randall, Lieutenant John Kidner, Corporal Brown, and troopers Harrison and Baker. The seventh was a French liaison officer De Maison from 4 SAS (French). Priority of objectives were as follows: location of potential airfields, emergency landing grounds and telecommunications, but this was changed to reporting on troop movements and identifying targets for airstrikes.

== Haft ==
The first part of the team Blackman, KInder and Randall were parachuted in on the evening of 8 July 1944 by a Handley Page Halifax from RAF Tempsford. The team were dropped in the Mayenne-Laval-Le Mans area as planned. The next day they established contact with the French resistance including the local leader Lemée who was to be their guide. On the third night the rest were safely landed; Blackman and Kidner set off, with Lemée as their guide, to reconnoitre the villages in the area toward Le Ham. The Haft party also met up with the Special Operations Executive team code named Scientist which consisted of five agents. These were Claude and Lise de Baissac, Mary Katherine Herbert, Roger Landes and Phyllis Latour.

Blackman soon learned from the Scientist team that the Haft insertion had been observed by German troops garrisoned at the nearby village of Lassey. The men therefore moved on foot by night, staying with members of the local population during the day even as German vehicles drove past the windows. All this meant that the men could gather their intelligence in comfort designated as 'planks' where they would then move on to another location. A few days later they repeated the exercise in the direction of St Mars. Here the local population was openly hostile to the Germans and many Frenchmen openly seen in uniform. Randall called in an RAF strike to target the bridges west of Javron-les-Chapelles which the Germans were using to send supplies and reinforcements to area around Caen facing Second British Army.

The operation was intended to be considerably larger, but it was realised the party would be operating too close to the front lines for the sensible employment of a large party tasked with sabotage as well as intelligence gathering. The team were able to use the 1,000 foot peak of Mont du Saule as a place of observation. One of the biggest airstrikes made by the RAF which were pinpointed by the Haft team was against a German troop and tank concentration area near the village of Villaines-la-Juhel. On 31 July the RAF struck this area with such accuracy that the Germans began retreating in droves, many were seen with visibly low morale and some with no boots on.

Eventually the party found increasingly fewer likely targets and contacted the leading elements of the George Patton's US Third Army. US XX Corps advanced towards the team, finally crossing the lines to meet with a tank destroyer battalion.

== Aftermath ==
The Scientist team described their co-operation with the SAS as invaluable. The men of the SAS party identified more than forty targets, many of which were then subjected to air attack. The operation was noted for its close and 'excellent' cooperation with SOE, headquarters and the French resistance.

For a team of only seven men that caused so much disruption Operation Haft was notably successful. Randall and his men were taken by the Americans to meet up with the intelligence officer of second British Army. Here they were briefed and were noted of the big success of the operation. The unit was sent home on leave - Blackman was awarded the Military Medal and Randall mention in dispatches.
