= Paddy Mayne =

British Army officer (1915–1955)

Lieutenant-Colonel Paddy Mayne DSO & Three Bars
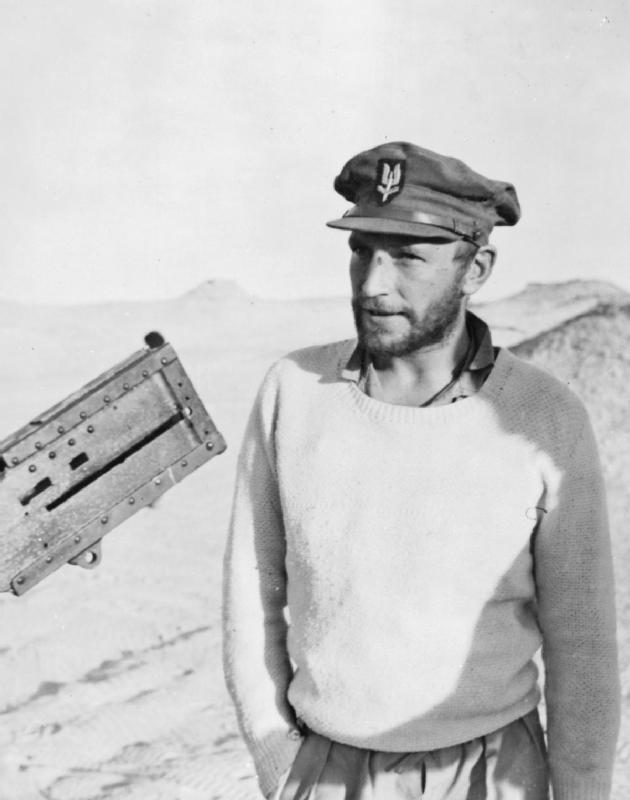
- Mayne as a lieutenant near Kabrit, Egypt, in 1942
- Born: 11 January 1915; Newtownards, County Down, Ireland
- Died: 14 December 1955 (aged 40); Newtownards, County Down, Northern Ireland
- Education: Queen's University Belfast
- Military career
- Allegiance: United Kingdom
- Branch: British Army
- Service years: 1939–1945
- Rank: Lieutenant-Colonel
- Nicknames: Paddy; The Irish Lion
- Service number: 87306
- Commands: 1st Special Air Service Regiment
- Conflicts: See battles: Second World War; North African Campaign; Battle of the Litani River; Sicily Campaign; Operation Overlord; Operation Houndsworth; Operation Wallace; Operation Howard
- Awards: Companion of the Distinguished Service Order & Three Bars; Mentioned in Despatches; Legion of Honour (France); Croix de guerre (France)
- Other work: Solicitor, Secretary to the Law Society of Northern Ireland

Lieutenant-Colonel Robert Blair Mayne, DSO & Three Bars (11 January 1915 – 14 December 1955), best known as Paddy Mayne or familiarly as Blair, was a British Army officer from Newtownards. He was an amateur boxing champion, qualified as a solicitor and played rugby union for Ireland and the British Lions before becoming a founding member of the Special Air Service (SAS).

Serving with distinction during the Second World War, Mayne became one of the British Army's most highly decorated officers. He was controversially denied the Victoria Cross, a decoration which King George VI remarked "so strangely eluded him".

== Early life and sporting achievements ==
Robert Blair Mayne was born at Newtownards, County Down, Ireland, the child of a staunch Presbyterian family of Scottish extraction. The Maynes became prominent in Ulster as merchants and landowners, owning several retail businesses in County Down. Mayne was christened Robert Blair after a second cousin, Lt Claude Leslie Blair MC, who at the time of his birth was serving with the Royal Engineers in the First World War. The family home, Mount Pleasant House, was situated on the hills above Newtownards.

Mayne attended Regent House Grammar School. His talent for rugby union became evident, and he played for the school first XV and also the local Ards RFC team from the age of 16. While at RHGS he also played cricket and golf, and showed aptitude as a marksman in the rifle club. Mayne then went up to read law at Queen's University Belfast, studying to become a solicitor.

As an undergraduate at Queen's, Mayne took up boxing, becoming Irish Universities Heavyweight Champion in August 1936. He followed this by reaching the final of the British Universities Heavyweight Championship but was beaten on points. With a handicap of 8, he won the Scrabo Golf Club President's Cup the next year.

Mayne as an adult was 6 ft 3 in (1.91 m) tall and weighed 15.5 stone (98 kg).

Mayne's first full Ireland rugby cap also came in 1937, in a match against Wales. After gaining five more caps as a lock forward, Mayne was selected for the 1938 British Lions tour to South Africa. While the Lions lost the first Test, a South African newspaper stated Mayne was "outstanding in a pack which gamely and untiringly stood up to the tremendous task". He played in seventeen of the twenty provincial matches and in all three Tests. While touring, Mayne's rambunctious nature came to the fore, smashing up teammates' hotel rooms, temporarily freeing a convict he had befriended and who was working on the construction of the Ellis Park Stadium, and also sneaking off from a formal dinner to go antelope hunting. Returning home from South Africa, he joined Malone RFC in Belfast.

Mayne won praise during the three Ireland matches he played in 1939, with one report stating "Mayne, whose quiet almost ruthless efficiency is in direct contrast to O'Loughlin's exuberance, appears on the slow side, but he covers the ground at an extraordinary speed for a man of his build, as many a three quarter and full back have discovered".

Also an Officer Cadet in Queen's University, Belfast Contingent, Officers' Training Corps, Mayne graduated from Queen's as LLB in early 1939, joining George Maclaine & Co. in Belfast, having been articled in the solicitor's firm of Thomas C.G. Mackintosh for the five previous years.

== Second World War ==
=== Initial assignments ===
In February 1939, prior to the outbreak of the Second World War, Mayne joined the 4th Battalion (Extra Reserve) of the Royal Ulster Rifles at Newtownards before receiving, the following month, a commission in the Royal Artillery and was posted to 5 Light Anti-Aircraft Battery (5LAA), in 8 Anti-Aircraft Regiment, later 8 (Belfast) Heavy Anti-Aircraft Regiment. When 5 LAA Battery was assigned to 9 Anti-Aircraft Regiment for overseas service, Mayne was transferred out to 66 Light AA Regiment in Northern Ireland. Then, in April 1940, he was transferred back to the Royal Ulster Rifles.

Following Winston Churchill's call to form a "butcher and bolt" raiding force following the Dunkirk evacuation, Mayne volunteered for the newly formed No. 11 (Scottish) Commando being seconded to the Cameronians (Scottish Rifles). He first saw action in June 1941 as a second lieutenant with 11 Commando during the Syria–Lebanon campaign. Mayne successfully led a section of men during the Battle of the Litani River in Lebanon against Vichy French Forces. The operation was commanded by Major Dick Pedder, Highland Light Infantry, who was killed in action. Mayne played a distinguished part in the raid, being mentioned in despatches.

=== Transfer to the SAS ===
Mayne's friend Lieutenant Eoin McGonigal recommended him to Captain David Stirling McGonigal was a fellow subaltern in No. 11 (Scottish) Commando, and an early volunteer for the Special Air Service (SAS), then known simply as the "Parachute Unit". It is widely believed that Mayne was under arrest for hitting his commanding officer, Lieutenant-Colonel Geoffrey Keyes when Stirling met him. According to Keyes' personal diary he was not at 11 Commando officers' mess at Salamis on Cyprus on the evening of 21 June 1941, the date on which Mayne was accused of beating up a fellow officer, Major Charles Napier. Keyes had stayed the night elsewhere, and arrived at Salamis the following day, 22 June 1941, when the trouble was already over. Keyes states in his diary that he conducted an investigation and found Mayne responsible.

Keyes' diary makes it clear that Mayne was brought before Brigadier Reginald Rodwell, on 23 June, for assaulting Napier, the second-in-command of his battalion. Mayne had a grudge against Napier, who had not taken part in the Litani raid, and who, according to a serving member of 11 Commando, had shot Mayne's dog in his absence. Mayne was furious about this, having been attached to his loyal pet. Keyes' diary records that, on the evening of 21 June, after drinking heavily in the mess, Mayne waited by Napier's tent and assaulted him when he returned. Keyes also records in his diary that Mayne was dismissed from 11 Commando the following day, 23 June, but does not state that he was arrested.

=== SAS – 1941 and 1942 ===
From November 1941 through to the end of 1942 during the Western Desert Campaign, Mayne participated in numerous night raids deep behind enemy lines in the deserts of Egypt and Libya, where the SAS wrought havoc by destroying many enemy aircraft on the ground. Mayne pioneered the use of military jeeps to conduct surprise hit-and-run raids, particularly on Axis airfields. The National Army Museum stated that Mayne had "a personal tally of more than 100 aircraft destroyed."

The first successful raid at Wadi Tamet in Libya on 14 December 1941, where aircraft and petrol dumps were destroyed, helped keep the SAS in existence, following the failure of the previous initial raid behind enemy lines at Sirte. For his part in the Tamet raid Mayne was appointed a Companion of the Distinguished Service Order (DSO). Promoted to lieutenant after the second raid of Tamet on 27 December 1941, Mayne also received a mention in despatches on 24 February 1942.

Mayne's official report on the Tamet raid notes:

The following damage was done on or in the vicinity of the aerodrome:
(a) Bombs were placed on 14 aircraft;
(b) 10 aircraft were damaged by having instrument panels destroyed;
(c) Bomb and petrol dumps were blown up;
(d) Reconnaissance was made down to the seafront but only empty huts were found;
(e) Several telephone poles were blown up;
(f) Some Italians were followed, and the hut they came out of was attacked by sub-machine gun and pistol fire and bombs were placed on and around it. There appeared to be roughly thirty inhabitants. Damage inflicted unknown.

Mayne took part in the most successful SAS raid of the Desert War when, on the night of 26 July 1942, with eighteen armed jeeps, British and French commandos raided the Sidi Haneish Airfield. Avoiding detection, they destroyed up to 40 German aircraft escaping with the loss of only three jeeps and two men killed in action.

=== Commanding officer ===
Following Stirling's capture in January 1943, 1st SAS Regiment was reorganised into two separate parts, the Special Raiding Squadron (SRS) and the Special Boat Section (the forerunner of the Special Boat Service). As a major, Mayne was appointed to command the Special Raiding Squadron and led the unit in Sicily and Italy until the end of 1943. In Sicily, Mayne was awarded a bar to his DSO. The official citation reads as follows:

On 10 July 1943, Major Mayne carried out two successful operations, the first the capture of CD battery the outcome of which was vital to the safe landing of 13 Corps. By nightfall SRS had captured three additional batteries, 450 prisoners, as well as killing 200 to 300 Italians. The second operation was to capture and hold of the town of Augusta. The landing was carried out in daylight – a most hazardous combined operation. By the audacity displayed, the Italians were forced from their positions and masses of stores and equipment were saved from enemy demolition. In both these operations it was Major Mayne's courage, determination and superb leadership which proved the key to success. He personally led his men from landing craft in the face of heavy machine-gun fire. By this action, he succeeded in forcing his way to ground where it was possible to form up and sum up the enemy's defences.

In January 1944 Mayne was promoted to lieutenant-colonel and appointed commanding officer of the re-formed 1st SAS Regiment. He subsequently led the SAS with great distinction and valour through the final campaigns of the war in France, the Netherlands, Belgium, Germany and Norway, often campaigning alongside local resistance fighters including the French Maquis. In recognition of his leadership and personal disregard for danger while in France, where he trained and worked closely with the French Resistance, Mayne received a second bar to his DSO. The official citation stated:

Lt-Col. R.B. Mayne DSO has commanded 1 SAS Regiment throughout the period of operations in France. On 8 August 1944, he was dropped to Operation Houndsworth base, located west of Dijon, in order to co-ordinate and take charge of the available detachments of his Regiment and co-ordinate their activities with a major Airborne landing which was then envisaged near Paris. He then proceeded in a jeep in daylight to motor to the GAIN base making the complete journey in one day. On the approach of Allied Forces, he passed through the lines in his jeep to contact the American Forces and to lead back through the lines his detachment of twenty jeeps landed for Operation Wallace. During the next few weeks, he successfully penetrated the German and American lines on four occasions in order to lead parties of reinforcements. It was entirely due to Lt-Col. Mayne's fine leadership and example, and his utter disregard for danger, that the unit was able to achieve such striking successes.

During the course of the War, Mayne became one of the British Army's most highly decorated soldiers receiving the DSO with three bars.

== Recommendation for the Victoria Cross ==
In April 1945, Mayne led two armoured jeep squadrons through the front lines toward Oldenburg in Operation Howard, the last one of its type in the war. He rescued his wounded men and eliminated a German machine-gun position in a local village. A citation, approved by Field Marshal Bernard Montgomery, commander of the Allied 21st Army Group, was issued recommending Mayne for the Victoria Cross.

The success of his mission to clear a path for the 4th Canadian (Armoured) Division and sow disorganisation among the enemy was due to his "brilliant military leadership and cool calculating courage" and a "single act of bravery" which "drove the enemy from a strongly held key village thereby breaking the crust of the enemy defences in the whole of this sector." However, in a standard practice of the time, the award was downgraded to a lesser award, and Mayne instead received a third bar to the DSO (a fourth award of the DSO).

Major General Sir Robert Laycock, post-War Chief of Combined Operations and former commander Special Service Brigade, wrote:

I feel I must drop you a line just to tell you how very deeply I appreciate the great honour of being able to address, as my friend, an officer who has succeeded in accomplishing the practically unprecedented task of collecting no less than four DSOs (I am informed that there is another such superman in the Royal Air Force (Note: Possibly referring to with Basil Embry or Willie Tait both with DSO and three bars)). You deserve all the more, and in my opinion, the appropriate authorities do not really know their job. If they did they would have given you a VC as well. Please do not dream of answering this letter, which brings with it my sincerest admiration and a deep sense of honour in having, at one time, been associated with you.

Among others, Mayne's contemporaries questioned why he was not awarded a Victoria Cross. The matter came to a head when, after a public campaign, the issue of a posthumous award was brought before the UK Parliament. An Early Day Motion was put before the House of Commons in June 2005, supported by more than 100 MPs, stating that:

This House recognises the grave injustice meted out to Lt-Col. Paddy Mayne, of 1st SAS, who won the Victoria Cross at Oldenburg in North West Germany on 9th April 1945; notes that this was subsequently downgraded, some six months later, to a third Bar DSO, that the citation had been clearly altered and that David Stirling, founder of the SAS has confirmed that there was considerable prejudice towards Mayne and that King George VI enquired why the Victoria Cross had 'so strangely eluded him'; further notes that on 14th December it will be 50 years since Col. Mayne's untimely death, in a car accident, and this will be followed on 29th January 2006 by the 150th anniversary of the signing of the Royal Warrant to institute the Victoria Cross; and therefore calls upon the Government to mark these anniversaries by instructing the appropriate authorities to act without delay to reinstate the Victoria Cross given for exceptional personal courage and leadership of the highest order and to acknowledge that Mayne's actions on that day saved the lives of many men and greatly helped the Allied advance on Berlin.

Whilst the UK Government declined to re-open the case, the Blair Mayne Association has vowed to continue campaigning for the Victoria Cross to be retrospectively conferred upon Mayne.

In 2025 there were renewed calls for Mayne to be posthumously awarded the Victoria Cross, the highest military decoration for gallantry, for his repeated heroic and gallant actions, in the face of the enemy, during the Second World War.

== After the War ==
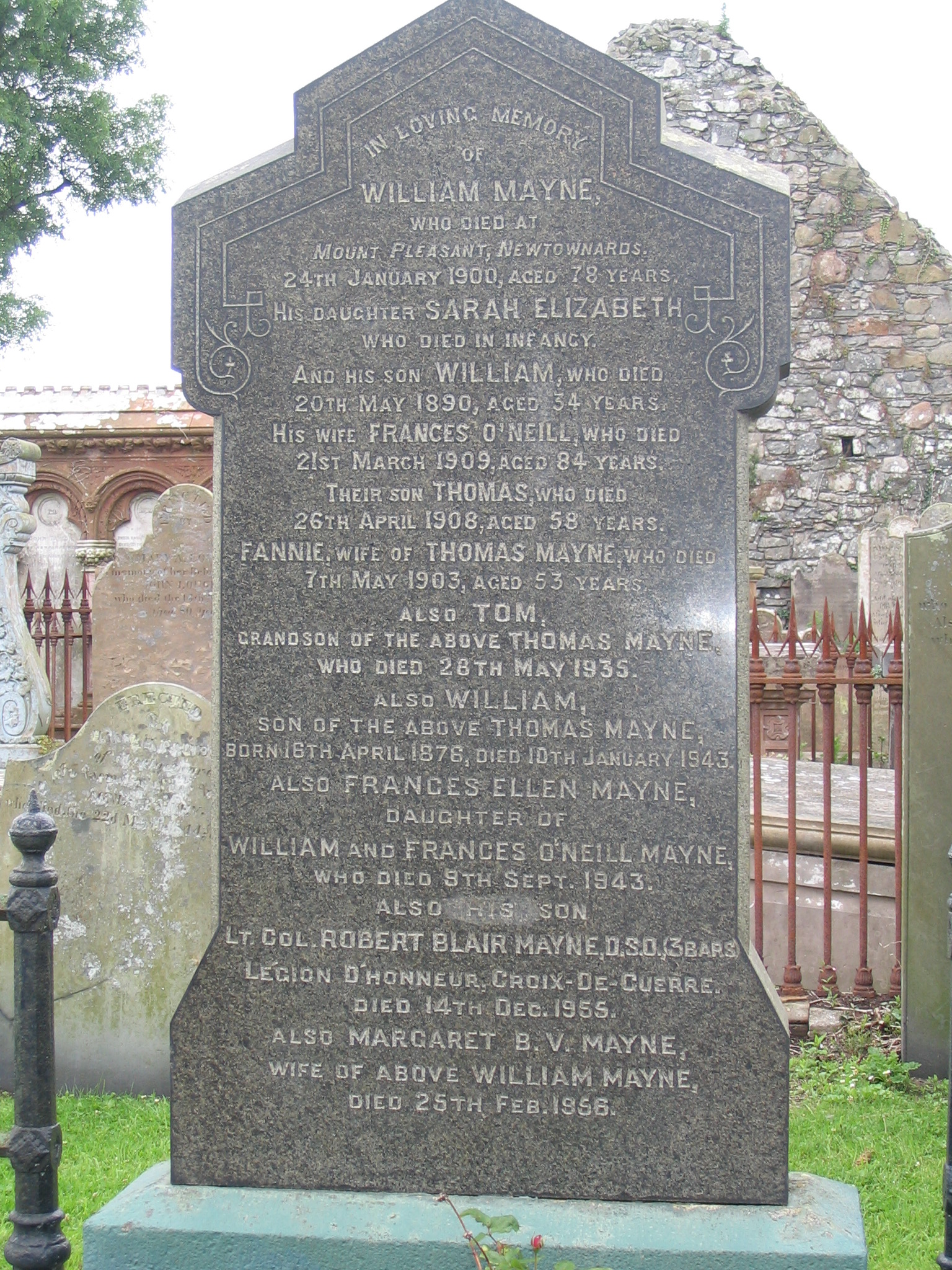
Col. Mayne's gravestone at Movilla Abbey in Newtownards, Co. Down

Recruited in 1945 by the Falkland Islands Dependencies Survey, he was appointed Deputy Expedition Leader, under Surgeon Captain Edward Bingham, to the Falkland Islands, Deception Island and Port Lockroy.

Mayne returned to Newtownards first practising as a solicitor and then becoming Secretary to the Law Society of Northern Ireland. He suffered severe back pain which prevented him even watching rugby as a spectator. He seldom talked about his wartime exploits.

On the night of Tuesday 13 December 1955, after attending a regular meeting of the Friendship Lodge, Mayne continued drinking with a fellow Freemason in the nearby town of Bangor, before driving home in the early hours. At about 04:00 he was found dead in his Riley roadster in Mill Street, Newtownards, reportedly having collided with a farmer's vehicle.

At his funeral, hundreds turned out to pay their respects before his burial in the Mayne family plot at Old Movilla Abbey churchyard. After his death, his masonic jewel was preserved for many years by an old schoolfriend before being presented to Newtownards Borough Council where it is displayed in the Mayoral Chamber at Ards and North Down Council Offices. Blair Mayne Road in the town was later named in his honour and, in 1997, a statue was dedicated to him outside Newtownards Town Hall.

=== Reputation ===
During the 1938 Lions tour it is said that Mayne relaxed by "wrecking hotels and fighting dockers".

Growing increasingly withdrawn as the War progressed, Mayne is described as preferring books to the company of friends, a tendency said to have become more marked after the death of his father, William Mayne (1876–1943). Refused leave to attend his father's funeral in Newtownards, a story tells of Mayne embarking on a drinking binge and rampage in central Cairo with a view to finding and beating up Richard Dimbleby, so as to highlight the travesty.

=== Legacy ===
A bronze statue of Blair Mayne stands in his memory at Conway Square, Newtownards.

In 2003 a temporary British Army base in Kuwait, occupied by the First Battalion of the Royal Irish Regiment, was named after him: Camp Blair Mayne. It was there that Lieutenant-Colonel Tim Collins, 1 Battalion, Royal Irish Regiment's commanding officer (himself a former SAS officer), delivered his celebrated address to British troops on the eve of the 2003 invasion of Iraq.

Mayne is depicted by Jack O'Connell in the 2022 BBC television historical drama SAS: Rogue Heroes.

== Honours and awards ==
Companion of the Distinguished Service Order with three Bars	24 February 1942; 21 October 1943 (1st Bar); 29 March 1945 (2nd Bar); 11 October 1945 (3rd Bar)
1939–45 Star	
Africa Star	With 8th ARMY clasp
Italy Star	
France and Germany Star	
Defence Medal	
War Medal 1939–1945 with bronze oak leaf clasp for Mention in Despatches	24 February 1942 (MiD)
Officer of the Legion of Honour	1946 (France)
Croix de guerre 1939–1945	1946 (France)

== See also ==
- 1st SAS Brigade
- SAS operations
