= List of mayors and provosts in the United Kingdom =

In the United Kingdom, the internal divisions of England, Northern Ireland, Wales and Scotland each have a different system of local government. Please see below for the most appropriate article relating to mayors or their equivalent:

- Mayors in England
- Mayors in Northern Ireland
- Mayors in Wales
- Provosts in Scotland

== See also ==
- Local government in England
- Local government in Scotland
- Local government in Wales
- Local government in Northern Ireland
