= Basra prison incident =

Incident between British soldiers and Iraqi police

The Basra prison incident was an event involving British troops in Basra, Iraq.

== Main incident ==
On 19 September 2005, two undercover British Special Air Service (SAS) soldiers dressed in traditional Arab garments and headdresses opened fire on a group of Iraqi Police officers after having been stopped at a roadblock. Two Iraqi police officers were shot, at least one of whom died. The two soldiers were arrested and taken to the Al Jameat Police Station.

The two SAS operators were part of Operation Hathor whose objective was keeping an Iraqi Police officer (who ran a crime unit with rumoured links to corruption and brutality in the city) under surveillance. Tension was already high between the Iraqi Police and British forces and when an Iraqi policeman tried to pull the operators from their vehicle at the roadblock, they opened fire, killing two of the policemen. The SAS men drove off with Iraqi Police in pursuit, but feeling they could not outrun them they decided to stop and talk their way out of it. The Iraqi police beat and arrested them.

In response, twenty members of A Squadron 22nd SAS Regiment and a platoon of paratroopers from the Special Forces Support Group (SFSG) flew from Baghdad to Basra. Other SAS operators tracked down their two colleagues to Al Jameat Police Station and then withdrew and called in Hathor's QRF (Quick Reaction Force) in Basra, whilst a MQ-1 Predator drone and Lynx helicopter fed the UK JOC a live feed on the prison.

Members of Number 2 Company, 1st Battalion Coldstream Guards supported by Warrior AFVs from the Staffordshire Regiment formed a cordon outside the police station whilst an SAS raid was organised.

British tanks and infantry encircled the jail where the men (whose photographs had been widely circulated but whose names had not been made public) were being held. A crowd gathered and began throwing stones and molotov cocktails at the Warrior infantry fighting vehicles, setting at least one ablaze. Three British soldiers were injured and, according to some reports, two demonstrators were killed. A letter of ultimatum was taken to the prison by two officers from 12th Brigade HQ who were themselves taken hostage whilst the SAS soldiers were bundled into the boot of a car and taken to a safe house in Basra.

Footage from the Lynx helicopter showed that the two SAS prisoners had been moved to a house not far from the prison and the British feared that they would be executed by Iraqi Hezbollah. Because of this, the rescue plan was altered so that a few members of A Squadron would assault the prison with regular army personnel and vehicles while the main SAS ground force assaulted the house. After nightfall, around 9pm, the British Army stormed the prison and house where the SAS men were being held. The SAS assault on the house met no resistance; they found the two prisoners in a locked room.

According to the Governor of the Basra Governorate, Mohammed al-Waili, the British had used "more than ten tanks backed by helicopters" to carry out the raid. The assault on the prison was spearheaded by Warrior IFV's and Challenger 2 tanks breaking down the walls and destroying cars and flimsy buildings. Eyewitness reports claimed that the assault allowed 150 prisoners to flee the prison.

The Ministry of Defence (MoD) initially denied storming the prison. In later statements, it said that the soldiers would have likely been killed, and that the police force had been infiltrated by illegal militia groups.

Muhammad al-Waili denounced the event as "barbaric, savage and irresponsible".

== Second incident ==
As part of Operation Sinbad, on 25 December 2006, British troops from The 1st Battalion The Staffordshire Regiment raided the Al Jameat Police Station, killing seven gunmen and freeing 127 prisoners being held by Shia militias there. They then blew up the building. A British Army spokesperson stated that the 127 prisoners freed had been tortured and that there were fears that they were about to be executed.

== See also ==
- Siege of UK bases in Basra
