= Jon Hollingsworth =

British Army Special Air Service soldier (1971–2006)

Jonathan Stuart Hollingsworth
- Born: 7 February 1971; Rotherham, Yorkshire, England
- Died: 23 November 2006 (aged 35); Al Baṣrah, Iraq
- Military career
- Allegiance: United Kingdom
- Branch: British Army
- Service years: 1987–2006
- Rank: Sergeant
- Service number: 24799563
- Unit: Special Air Service
- Conflicts: The Troubles; Iraq War
- Awards: Conspicuous Gallantry Cross; Queen's Gallantry Medal

Sergeant Jonathan Stuart Hollingsworth CGC, QGM (7 February 1971 – 23 November 2006) was a British Army soldier. Described as "an SAS hero" by a British tabloid newspaper, he reportedly sustained gunshot wounds during a raid to capture terror leaders in Basra and later died of his injuries at a nearby military hospital.

== Personal life ==
Jonathan Hollingsworth was born in 1971, in Rotherham, Yorkshire and lived in Hull. He was married and had two sons.

== Military career ==
Jon Hollingsworth joined the UK military aged 16, Joining the Junior Parachute Company in Pirbright, joining 11 Platoon in October 1987. Hollingsworth then went on to pass P company and was then a member of the 3rd Battalion, Parachute Regiment before eventually passing selection and joining D squadron, 22nd SAS Regiment. He was awarded the Queen's Gallantry Medal for operations in Northern Ireland.

Hollingsworth deployed with D squadron in 2006 and was assigned to 'Hathor' detachment; a British special forces detachment that carried out operations against Iraqi insurgents in Basra. In early November, only weeks before his death and shortly before his squadron was due to return to the UK, Hollingsworth was leading a raid ahead of his team on an insurgent-occupied building in Basra when he was shot in the back of the neck. The bullet missed his carotid artery by millimetres and he was sent to the UK for treatment, but returned to Iraq within days rather than taking time off to recover. He was awarded the Conspicuous Gallantry Cross for his actions in Iraq, reportedly for single-handedly killing six insurgents during a raid.

== Death ==
On the night of 23/24 November 2006, 'Hathor' detachment was given a mission to strike a block of insurgent occupied flats in Basra. The flats were located in a hostile part of the city and actionable intelligence led the assault force to this location. Hollingsworth was in command of the mission, which consisted of multiple assault teams; early in the ensuing firefight Sgt Hollingsworth was shot and was evacuated to a British military hospital at Shaibah. He died of his wounds sustained in this operation.

Hollingsworth was the first member of the British Special Forces to be killed in action since Operation Abalone on 31 October 2003. He was the 126th British soldier to be killed in operations in Iraq.

Hollingsworth was repatriated to a discreet funeral at Credenhill, and his widow was invited to a private meeting with the then Prime Minister Tony Blair. Defence Secretary Des Browne said: "The death of Sgt Hollingsworth is a terrible loss and my heartfelt sympathy goes out to his family, friends and comrades."

"Sgt Hollingsworth was killed on a successful operation to detain those who were known to attack both civilian and military personnel. He did not die in vain."

== Bibliography ==
- Urban, Mark (2012). Task Force Black: The Explosive True Story of the Secret Special Forces War in Iraq. St. Martin's Griffin. ISBN 978-1250006967.
