= Operation Kipling =

British Special Air Service operation between August–September 1944

- Part of Western Front
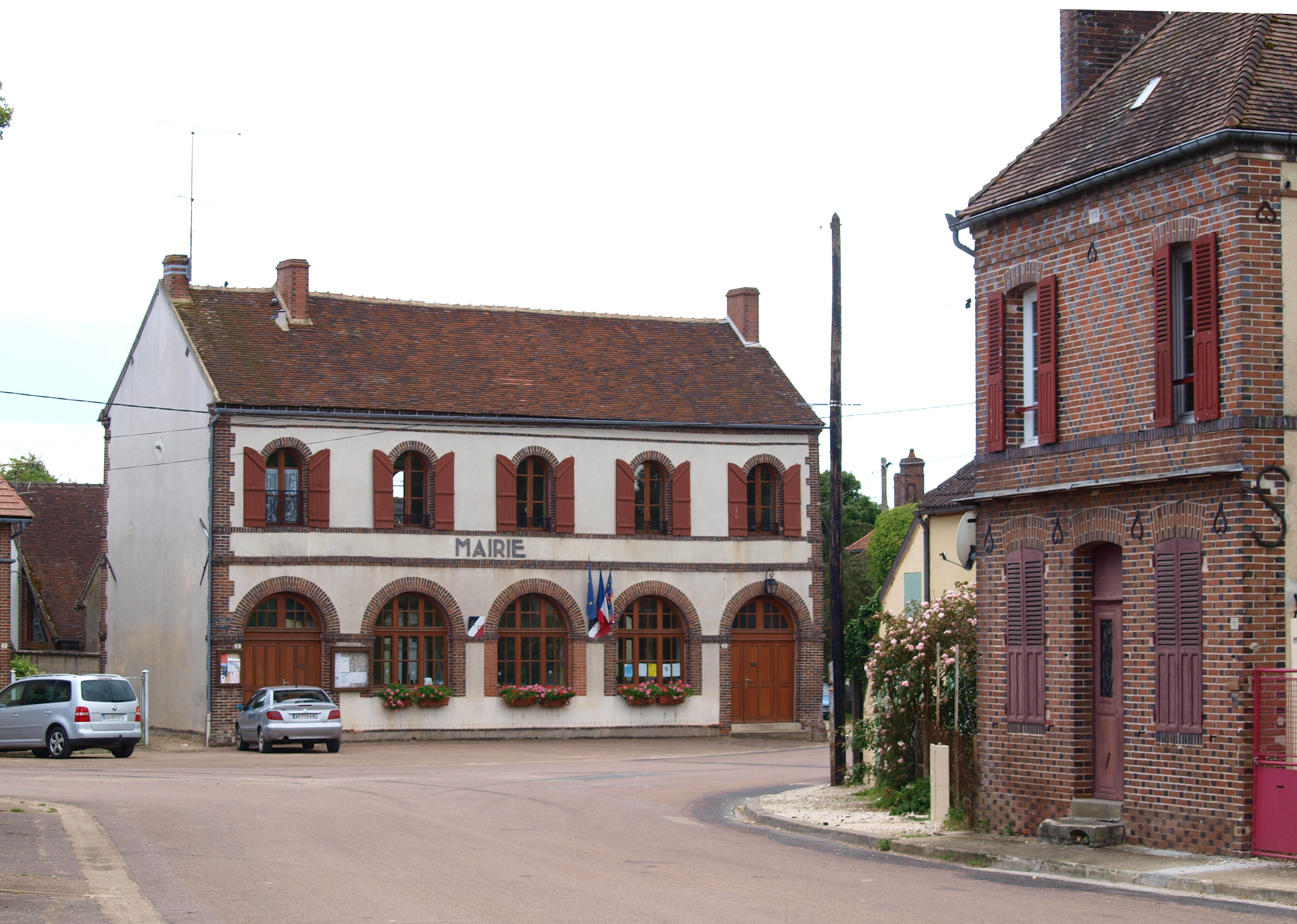
- Town hall in Les Ormes where the SAS attacked a Waffen SS execution squad during Operation Kipling
Date	13 August – 26 September 1944
Location	area of Yonne and Loiret, France
Result	British victory

Belligerents
United Kingdom	(Nazi Germany) Germany

Commanders and leaders
Tony Marsh	

Strength
1st Special Air Service: 'C' Squadron 107 men and 46 Jeeps	

Casualties and losses
2 Killed; 5 Wounded	200 + casualties numerous vehicles destroyed

Operation Kipling was a British special forces operation that took place during the Second World War in German-occupied France between 13 August and 26 September 1944. Originally supposed to be part of a larger airborne operation (Transfigure), 'C' Squadron, 1st Special Air Service commanded by Major Tony Marsh, was air dropped in an area near Orléans to disrupt German communications and troop movements. The operation was a success with minimum casualties and was the last SAS mission to be carried out as part of Operation Overlord.

== Background ==
In early 1944 the 1st Special Air Service Brigade was formed, headed by Roderick McLeod using specially converted American made Jeeps armed with a number of Vickers K guns. In May the Supreme Headquarters Allied Expeditionary Force (SHAEF) had issued an order for the SAS Brigade to carry out operations in France once the Normandy beachheads had been established.

On 20 June during the Battle of Normandy, SHAEF proposed Operation Transfigure, which was to be undertaken by the newly formed First Allied Airborne Army who were to be dropped within the Orléans gap (between Orléans and Paris) in the Loiret and Yonne regions to block the retreat of and disrupt any reinforcements of German forces. The 1st SAS Regiment commanded by Paddy Mayne would conduct operations Haggard and Kipling; the objectives being to reconnoitre and destroy as much of the Germans forces west of the Rhine and then link up with the advancing Allied armies.

Haggard (Major Eric Lepine) composed of B Squadron SAS was dropped west of the Loire and established a base between the towns of Bourges and Nevers. Kipling was to be undertaken by 107 men and 46 Jeeps led by Major Tony Marsh of C Squadron. They were to be dropped in the area to the west of Auxerre in central France.

== Operation ==
=== Establishment ===
An advance party of Kipling consisting of five men under Captain Derrick Harrison was dropped on the night of 13 August, at Les Placeaux in the Foret de Merry-Vaux. More men and Jeeps were delivered by C-47s by parachute during the evenings of the following days. The party established a base and was to lay low and make contacts with the local resistance forces.

During this time operation Transfigure was cancelled - following the breakout from Normandy the situation in the area at the time was constantly changing: the US Third Army was driving toward Reims, while other Allied forces were advancing from the south following the landings of Operation Dragoon. The SAS troopers instead were to undertake patrolling and set up ambushes instead, and link with the armies. The SAS thus encountered American troops in towns and villages they were in the process of or were about to liberate. Very few German troops had been encountered.

=== Attack on Les Ormes ===
On 23 August, Lieutenant Stewart Richardson in his Jeep accompanied by two troopers were looking to repair their Vickers K gun mounts at a Maquis base at Aillant. Captain Derrick Harrison with his driver Lance Corporal James 'Curly' Hall, accompanied them as support. On their way they heard gunfire, and then saw smoke rising above the village of Les Ormes. A woman suddenly appeared around the corner of a road on a bicycle shouting that there were Germans attacking the village, and was looking to get the Maquis to help. Harrison said to the French woman that he would attack the village with his two Jeeps.

The two raced into the town and on seeing the Germans vehicles parked up Richardson proceeded to shoot them up, them setting a number on fire. Harrison drove into the town square where he came across a large group of surprised Germans, who were men of a Waffen-SS unit. He immediately opened fire on them causing many losses, but soon they began to rally and fire back at his Jeep, and a desperate battle ensued. There were also 22 French civilians who were about to be executed in the town square, which was interrupted by the attack. Richardson in his jeep came in to assist Harrison, who he saw was in trouble. The latter had been wounded in the hand, his Jeep was badly shot up and the guns were jamming or overheating. His driver Jimmy Hall was killed with a bullet to the head during the exchange of fire. With Richardson's assistance and added firepower they began to pin the Germans down. Some twenty Germans making their way through an orchard into the square were scattered by Vickers fire. Richardson in his Jeep then picked up Harrison and on seeing the damage they had caused, they quickly withdrew.

More than sixty Germans were killed or wounded, including the commanding officer. Two staff cars and several trucks were burned. All but two of the twenty Frenchmen about to be executed were able to escape in the mayhem. Because of the raid, the Germans pulled out of Les Ormes not long after the raid, assuming that the SAS were a reconnaissance unit of an approaching Allied unit. The SAS came back in force to the village with the assistance of the Maquis. They found and buried Hall's body along with the two Frenchman.

=== Aggressive patrolling ===
Not long after, Paddy Mayne visited the camp and ordered that C squadron be more aggressive now that the Germans were withdrawing - this meant no prisoners were to be taken. Sergeant James McDiarmid, having been hit hard by the death of Hall, ambushed a German convoy with his Jeep and murdered a number of POWs. In another incident McDiarmid stopped a car carrying two German officers dressed in civilian clothes; they too were shot.

On 28 August, Major Marsh reached the SAS camp with twenty Jeeps. The next day the squadron, leaving one troop behind, drove to the Morvan area to relieve Bill Fraser's A Squadron, 1st SAS who had been conducting Operation Houndsworth.

Kipling continued, carrying out reconnaissance and attacking the Germans where possible. Another ambush took place on 7 September when three trucks filled with German troops were escorted by a number of armoured cars. The trucks were destroyed, as was an armoured car, and many casualties inflicted on the troops inside - for which Sergeant Bob Lowson was awarded a Military Medal.

C Squadron then patrolled much further from their base near Morvan, but suffered from lack of fuel as supply drops had to be cancelled due to adverse weather. Another ambush took place on a road near Nevers on 10 September - trucks and motorcycles were destroyed with about fifteen Germans killed. Another ambush against a mostly horse drawn unit was sprung a day later with another twenty Germans killed. The last part of the operation took place the next day - Lieutenant Mike Mycock was on a patrol which ended up joining with units of the French First Army, which was advancing from the south. Together they assisted in taking the surrender of 3,000 German soldiers at Autun.

== Aftermath ==
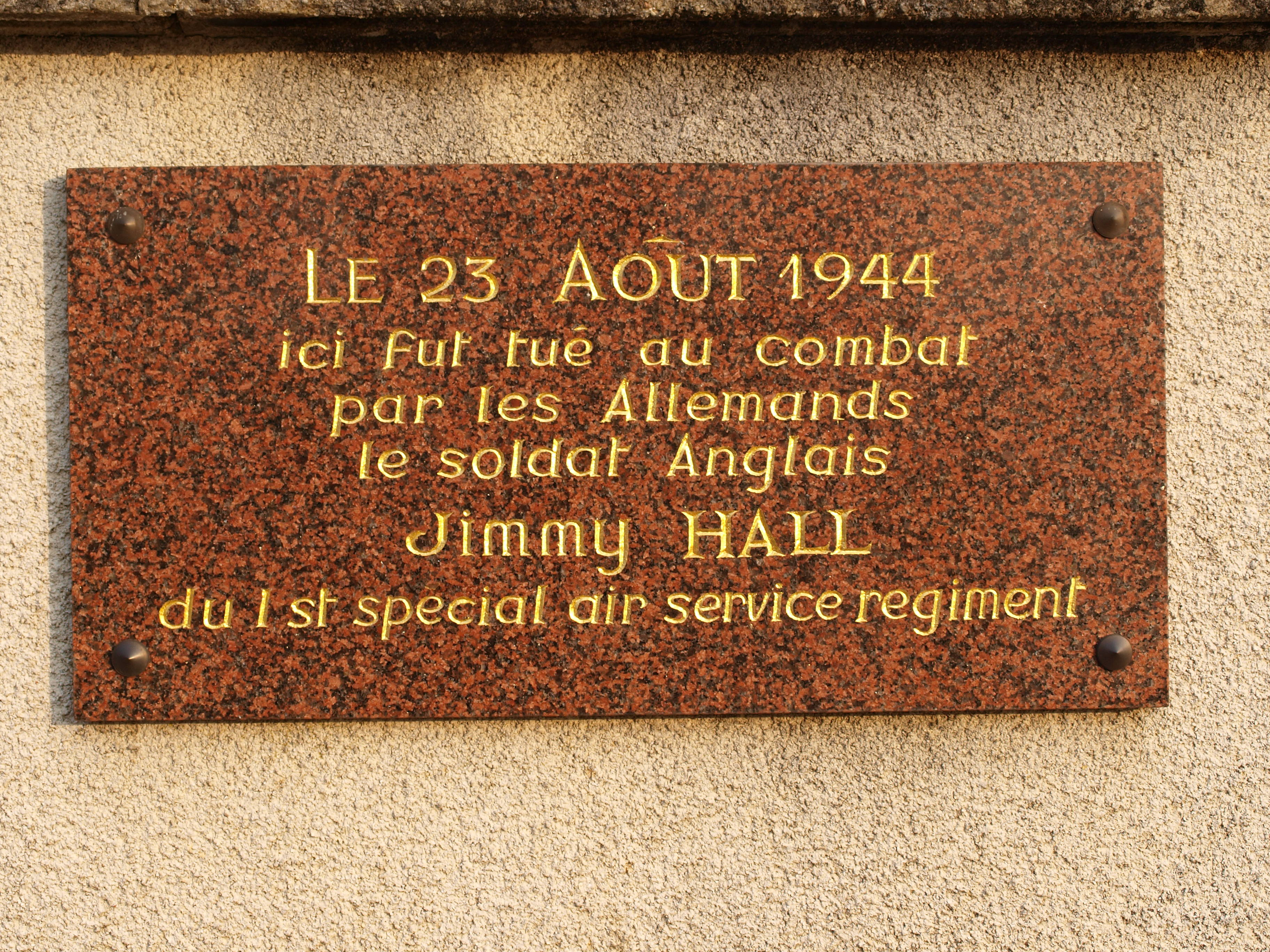
Memorial to Jimmy Hall in Les Ormes

Kipling officially ended on 24 September – C Squadron was withdrawn from its operational area. Then the squadron had moved back to Cosne to rest, and was ordered to Brussels for leave. With the cancellation of Operation Transfigure, Mayne and McLeod considered that it had been launched too late to have a significant impact. Despite this Kipling had been a success - the Germans had been continually harassed, suffered well over 200 casualties and with many vehicles destroyed. In return the SAS themselves had less than ten casualties, including two killed.

Harrison for his part on the raid on Les Ormes was later awarded the Military Cross.

Kipling was the last SAS operation to end following Operation Overlord. The brigade had inflicted an enormous amount of damage - some 2,300 Germans were killed, another 3,000 wounded and just over 1,000 taken prisoner, for the loss of 96 killed, wounded or captured, along with the destruction of a large number vehicles, armoured cars, bridges and rail transport. French and Belgian SAS units would be next involved for reconnaissance in the Ardennes in December 1944 during the Battle of the Bulge.

== Bibliography ==
- Collins, James Lawton (1986). Undercover Fighters. The British 22nd SAS Regiment. New York: Villard Books. ISBN 978-0-39-474405-6.
- Davies, Barry (2001). The Complete Encyclopedia of the SAS. London: Virgin. ISBN 978-0-75-350534-2.
- Hargreaves, Andrew L. (2013). Special Operations in World War II: British and American Irregular Warfare. Campaigns and Commanders Series. Vol. 39. Norman: University of Oklahoma Press. ISBN 978-0-80-615125-0.
- Macintyre, Ben (2016). SAS Rogue Heroes. London: Penguin Books. ISBN 978-0-24-118664-0.
- Mortimer, Gavin (2015). The SAS in World War II. London: Bloomsbury. ISBN 978-1-47-280875-2.
- Mortimer, Gavin (2020). The SAS in Occupied France: 1 SAS Operations, June to October 1944. Barnsley: Pen & Sword Books. ISBN 978-1-52-676965-7.
- Strawson, John (1984). A History of the S.A.S. Regiment. London: Secker & Warburg. ISBN 978-0-43-649992-0.
- Thompson, Major General Julian (1999). The Imperial War Museum: War Behind Enemy Lines. London: Pan Grand. ISBN 0-330-36761-7 – via Archive Foundation.
