= Operation Trent =

2001 British SAS assault in Afghanistan

- Part of the War in Afghanistan (2001–2021)
| Date | Mid to Late November 2001 |
| Location | Koh-I-Malik Mountain, Registan Desert, Helmand/Kandahar Province, Afghanistan, N29.647 E63.528 |
| Result | Coalition Victory |

Belligerents
| United Kingdom; United States | Islamic Emirate of Afghanistan; Taliban; al-Qaeda |

Commanders and leaders
| (United Kingdom) Ed Butler | Unknown |

Strength
| (United Kingdom) 100–140 SAS Operators (United States) At least 6 C-130 Hercules; 4 F-18 Hornets; 2 F-14 Tomcats | 60 or 80–100 |

Casualties and losses
| 4 wounded | 18 killed Several dozen wounded and captured |

Operation Trent was an operation by Special Air Service (SAS) elements of the British Army, the largest known post-WWII operation in SAS history. Tony Blair had requested that the SAS be allowed an operation. The operation was carried out by members of a regimental task group, made up of a tactical HQ, members of A Squadron (A Sqn) and G Squadron (G Sqn) of the 22nd Special Air Service Regiment (22 SAS), supported by United States (US) forces, on an al-Qaeda-linked opium plant during the 2001 invasion of Afghanistan at the start of Operation Enduring Freedom – Afghanistan (OEF-A).

== Background ==
Following the September 11, 2001 attacks on the US by al-Qaeda, the US and the United Kingdom (UK) began the invasion of Afghanistan on 7 October 2001, to dismantle and destroy al-Qaeda and to deny it a safe base of operations in Afghanistan by removing the Taliban from power.

In mid-October 2001, A Sqn and G Sqn of 22 SAS deployed to north west Afghanistan in support of OEF-A under the command of United States Central Command (CENTCOM). They conducted largely uneventful reconnaissance tasks under the codename Operation Determine, none of these tasks resulted in enemy contact; after a fortnight and with missions drying up both squadrons returned to their barracks in the UK.

=== Prelude ===
After political intersession with Prime Minister Tony Blair, the SAS were given a direct-action task – the destruction of an al-Qaeda-linked opium processing plant. The facility was located 190 mi (300 km) southwest of Kandahar at the foot of the 5,900 ft (1,800 m) Koh-I-Malik mountain, 12 mi (20 km) north of the Pakistan border, the facility was made up of a system of houses, compounds and caves, with defences consisting of trench lines and several makeshift bunkers-manned by between 80 and 100 foreign fighters mostly from al-Qaeda. Intelligence indicated that some of the terrorists guarding the facility were well armed and trained at one of al-Qaeda's top training camps and that their morale would be high. It was being used as a headquarters and a staging post for al-Qaeda and the Taliban for getting drugs and equipment across the border into Pakistan, it was also an Opium factory. In mid-November 2001, A and G squadron 22 SAS were covertly re-inserted into Bagram Airfield under the codename Operation Blood to carry out the assault. The SAS were ordered to assault the facility in full daylight: the timelines had been mandated by CENTCOM and were based on the availability of air support assets – only one hour of on-call close air support was provided. The timings meant that the squadrons could not carry out a detailed reconnaissance of the site prior to the assault being launched. Despite these factors, the commanding officer of 22 SAS, Lieutenant Colonel Ed Butler, accepted the mission. The target was a low priority for the US and probably would have been destroyed from the air if the British hadn't argued for a larger role in Afghanistan; US SOF commanders guarded targets for their own units. The area of the facility had not often been visited and rarely surveyed, they did not have maps of a scale smaller than 1:250,000, on which the proposed LZ was not shown, the SAS would have to insert an advance team to check its suitability. Sources vary on number of SAS members involved in the operation, 100 being the lowest 120 and 140 being the highest

== Operation ==
=== Insertion ===
The mission began in November 2001, with an 8-man patrol from G Sqn's Air Troop performing a HALO parachute jump from a United States Air Force (USAF) or Royal Air Force (RAF) C-130 Hercules flying out of Camp Rhino at 20,050 ft (6,110 m) (other sources say 28,000 ft (8,500 m)) and parachuting through Sub-zero temperatures with their parachutes opening automatically at 4,000 ft (1,220 m) - onto a barren desert site in Registan in Helmand/Kandahar Province to test its suitability as an improvised airstrip for the landing of the main assault force in 6 USAF C-130 Hercules. The Air Troop team confirmed it was suitable and marked out the 900 ft × 40 ft (274 m × 12 m) runway and moved to lay-up positions. Seventeen hours later, the fleet of C-130s (flying out of Bagram Airfield) began to land, each touching down just long enough for the SAS to disembark in their vehicles. Operators from A Sqn G Sqn drove directly off the ramps as the aircraft moved along the desert strip before taking off again; driving 38 Land Rover DPV 110 "pinkies", 2 logistics vehicles and 8 Kawasaki dirt bikes, they formed up and proceeded towards their target. One Land Rover broke down due to an engine problem, the vehicle was left behind, its 3-man crew stayed to guard it (they were picked up when the assault force exfilled). The assault force drove 120 mi (190 km), the drive being difficult due to poor visibility as a result of the fine dust) within a limited amount of time, to a previously agreed forming-up point and split into two elements - the main assault force and the FSB (fire support base). A Sqn was given the task of assaulting the target facility, while G Sqn took the role of FSB. G Sqn would suppress the enemy with vehicle-mounted 0.300 in (7.62 mm) L7A2 GPMGs, 0.5 in (12.7 mm) M2 Browning HMGs, MILAN antitank missiles along with L16 81mm mortars and 0.5 in (12.7 mm) Barrett M82A1 sniper rifles, (from a position 0.50 mi (0.8 km) away) allowing A Sqn to close in on the target. The force was out of range of coalition artillery. If necessary, G Sqn would send in additional men if the attack got pinned down. The force lay in wait during the first hours of the early morning. Just after 0700h, A Sqn observed the enemy moving in and out of the trenches.

=== Assault ===
The assault began with a preparatory air-strike: United States Navy (USN) F/A-18 Hornets (F-18) and F-14 Tomcats (F-14) bombed and strafed the area, destroying the plant's depots (£50 million worth of opium). Following this, A Sqn moved at high speed from its start line, firing their weapons whilst dodging RPG-7 rockets. They pulled up meters from the outer perimeter to dismount from their vehicles and closed in on the last few hundred yards to the target on foot over difficult terrain. The main body formed a semi-circle in front of, and below, the first trenches, where they were ordered to assault. The opposing forces responded by firing their AK-47 assault rifles and RPG-7s, while other fighters could be seen moving into positions further away. All the while, G Sqn (who were positioned in a 'bullhorn' formation around the facility) provided covering fire with heavy weapons onto the facility. A Sqn encountered heavy resistance from the bunkers and trenches and eventually became pinned down. Air support flew sorties until they ran out of munitions. On a final pass, after destroying an enemy-occupied bunker with a GPS-guided JDAM, an F-18 strafed a bunker with its Vulcan cannon, narrowly missing several members of G Sqn.

As A Sqn closed on the fortified positions, an SAS trooper was wounded, with two other SAS members dashing forward and carrying him to safety. At least 12 SAS soldiers managed to penetrate the entrances to caves and trenches, killing at least 6 al-Qaeda and / or Taliban fighters. Even though they were not well trained, the Al-Qaeda fighters fought ferociously and the SAS had to fight hard to make progress. As the fighting continued, more and more fighters came out of the trenches and into the open, with heavy fire being exchanged; one SAS officer was hit by two rounds in his ceramic plates and a third in his water bottle on his belt kit. A member of the SAS who participated in the raid said of the terrorists that "these guys were lunatics" and that "surrender was the last thing on their minds. They would run out of the front line firing. It was something out of the First World War, these were not people, proper soldiers, who could be treated with dignity. If they had a breath left in them they would be trying to shoot you so we had no choice but to kill."

The RSM in command of the FSB joined in the action, bringing forward the CO's HQ team to reinforce A Sqn when he believed the assault was stalling. They were several hundred meters from the enemy positions when he was shot in the leg by an AK-47 round, making him the second SAS soldier to be wounded. Several SAS soldiers wore body armour and helmets, which prevented more serious injury. However, wearing the tactical helmets and plate carrier body armour was unpopular, and allegedly the soldiers had to be ordered to wear them. Eventually, the A Sqn assault force reached the objective and cleared the caves. In one cave, they found 3 fighters sleeping, who were killed when they started scrambling for their weapons. They also cleared the HQ building, gathering all intelligence materials they could find. More fighters closed in on the SAS assault force who were then engaged by SAS snipers as both sides were now too close for air support to be called in. After 2 hours and finally mopping up the last remnants of al-Qaeda fighters at the facility, the objective had been cleared. In the al-Qaeda HQ, A Sqn members found an intelligence bounty- two laptops and a mass of paperwork with information. The mission lasted 4 hours and a total of 4 SAS operators had been wounded. Both squadrons withdrew and rendezvoused with a US CH-47 Chinook to extract their wounded, while the rest were extracted by C-130 Hercules from a TLZ (Temporary Landing Zone).

== Aftermath ==
The 4 wounded SAS operators' injuries were not life-threatening. The lowest number of al-Qaeda and Taliban fighters killed is 18; Several dozen more were wounded and captured, though no high level al-Qaeda leadership were among those killed or captured. By 18 December 2001, members of A Sqn and G Sqn were back at their base in the UK. Members of both squadrons were awarded a total of two CGCs, one DSO, two MCs and several MiDs; the strategic significance of the facility has never fully been explained. In January and February 2002, media sensationalised with accounts of the operation based mostly on speculation, with some suggesting that the bravery of the SAS merited Victoria Crosses.

=== Date of the operation ===
Most sources place the operation in November (specifically between mid and late November) of that year, however some sources say the operation took place in December. One source gives the date as 22 November.

== See also ==
- Operation Larchwood 4
- JOG (Air) Joint Operations Graphic, series 1501 (air), sheet NH 41-11 "Jelejel, Afghanistan", edition 2 (1988)
