= Operation Dunhill =

Airborne operation during World War II

During World War II, Operation Dunhill was a Special Air Service operation which began on 3 August 1944. Five teams totalling 59 men, led by Captain Greville Bell, were to liaise with the French Resistance and disrupt German activity in Rennes and Laval in advance of Operation Cobra, the American breakout from Normandy.

In the event, four of the teams were relieved by the advancing Americans within twenty-four hours.

The fifth team reported on German movements and secured about 200 Allied airmen before they met with the ground forces on 24 August.
