= Mayors in Northern Ireland =

In Northern Ireland, if a local government district has borough status then the chairman and vice chairman of the borough council may be styled mayor and deputy mayor, respectively. These provisions date from the Local Government Act (Northern Ireland) 1972; some towns already had borough status which was carried over to their post-1972 district, while other districts later petitioned for a charter granting borough status. The head of Belfast City Council has been styled Lord Mayor of Belfast since 1892.

== Lord Mayors ==
The right to appoint a Lord Mayor is a rare honour, even less frequently bestowed than city status; a Lord Provost also acts as Lord Lieutenant of their city.

Currently, only the cities of Belfast and Armagh have a Lord Mayor, with the latter being conferred with the honorific title by the Queen as part of the Diamond Jubilee celebrations.

=== Mayoresses and Lady Mayoresses ===
The wife of a male mayor is called the mayoress and accompanies him to civic functions. A female mayor or an unmarried male one may appoint a female consort as mayoress. The former Lord Mayor of Belfast, Naomi Long, broke with tradition and appointed her husband as Lord Mayor's Consort, the first man to hold this position.

== See also ==
- Local government in Northern Ireland
- Lord Mayor of Belfast
- Mayor of Derry
