= Operation Houndsworth =

British Special Air Service operation between June–September 1944

- Part of the Western Front
- Map of France, with the Burgundy region highlighted in red
Date	6 June – 6 September 1944
Location	Burgundy, France
Result	Allied victory

Belligerents
United Kingdom (Free France) FFI	Germany

Commanders and leaders
(United Kingdom) Major Bill Fraser	Unknown

Units involved
"A" Squadron, 1st Special Air Service	Unknown

Strength
144	Unknown

Casualties and losses
10 killed 8 Wounded	220 killed or wounded 132 captured 6 trains derailed 70 vehicles destroyed

Operation Houndsworth was a British Special Air Service operation during World War II. The operation, carried out by "A" Squadron, 1st Special Air Service between 6 June and 6 September 1944, was centred on Dijon in the Burgundy region of France. Their objective was to disrupt German lines of communication, coordinate the activities of the French Resistance and prevent German reinforcements moving to the Normandy beachheads, especially the 2nd SS Panzer Division Das Reich.

== Background ==
The men involved in Operation Houndsworth were part of the Special Air Service Brigade. The Special Air Service (SAS) was a unit of the British Army during the Second World War, formed in July 1941 by David Stirling and originally called "L" Detachment, Special Air Service Brigade—"L" being an attempt at deception implying the existence of numerous such units. It was conceived as a commando type force to operate behind enemy lines in the North African Campaign.

In 1944 the Special Air Service Brigade was formed and consisted of the British 1st and 2nd Special Air Service, the French 3rd and 4th Special Air Service and the Belgian 5th Special Air Service. They were to undertake parachute operations behind the German lines in France, and then carry out operations supporting the Allied advance through Belgium, the Netherlands, and eventually into Germany.

In May 1944 the Supreme Headquarters Allied Expeditionary Force (SHAEF) had issued an order for the Special Air Service Brigade to carry out two operations in France. The two operations were Operation Houndsworth in the area of Dijon given 'A' Squadron 1st Special Air Service and Operation Bulbasket in the area of Poitiers given to 'B' Squadron 1st Special Air Service.

The focus of both operations would be the disruption of German reinforcements from the south of France to the Normandy beachheads. To carry out the operation they would destroy supply dumps, block the two railway lines between Paris–Lyons–Chalon-sur-Saône and Paris–Le Creusot–Nevers. One unit they especially wanted to delay was the 2nd SS Panzer Division Das Reich which was based in the area around Toulouse in the south of France. The intelligence experts at SHAEF responsible for planning the Normandy landings had estimated it would take three days for the panzer division to reach Normandy.

== Mission ==
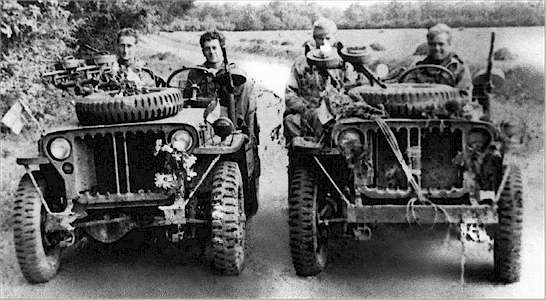
Special Air Service Jeeps armed with Vickers K machine guns during Operation Houndsworth

Operation Houndsworth consisted of 18 officers and 126 men of 'A' Squadron, 1st Special Air Service (SAS). The SAS reconnaissance party landed in the area on 6 June 1944. They were followed by the rest of the squadron under the command of Major Bill Fraser over the night of 10/11 June 1944. A number of Jeeps armed with Vickers K machine guns were also parachuted in. The squadron was established in a patrol base in the mountainous wooded countryside southwest of Dijon near Chalaux, in the Morvan which is in the Nièvre department.

The SAS expanded their operations further to the south near Dijon with Operation Wallace which took the pressure off Houndsworth.

The Squadron then proceeded with operations during which the Lyon to Paris rail lines were blown up 22 times. After one occasion a member of the French resistance approached the workmen repairing the lines and asked how long the repairs would take. Becoming aware of his loyalties they suggested that if the line had been cut further up more damage could have been caused. They then proceeded to draw him a diagram suggesting exactly where to do it next time.

The squadron also killed or wounded 220 Germans, captured 132 prisoners of war, and identified 30 targets for Royal Air Force interdiction. The operation was not without loss to the SAS; during the operation, they lost eight men wounded and ten men killed. The success of the operation resulted in the Germans retaliating against local villages. The residents of Dun-les-Places, Montsauche-les-Settons and Planchez all suffered and a number of residents were murdered during German reprisals.

The Germans eventually became aware of the location of the SAS camp and started what they thought would be a surprise attack on 20 August 1944. Unknown to them, members of the French resistance knew about the attack, and Corporal David Danger of the SAS got through the cordon the Germans had put around the camp and was able to warn the squadron. Pre-warned, the SAS fought off the Germans.

== Aftermath ==
Houndsworth was to end on 6 September 1944. Having operated non-stop for three months, the men of A Squadron were exhausted and therefore it was decided to relieve A Squadron with C Squadron who had been running their own Operation Kipling.

Houndsworth had been extremely successful: six trains had been derailed, 22 railway lines cut, 70 vehicles destroyed, and about 3,000 members of the French resistance provided with arms. Danger was awarded the Military Medal on 29 March 1945 for his part in foiling the attack on the camp, and his skill in maintaining radio communication from behind enemy lines for four months.
