= Operation Defoe =

During World War II, Operation Defoe was a reconnaissance patrol by 21 men of the Special Air Service conducted from 19 July to 23 August to support the British Second Army in the Argentan area of Normandy.
