= Operations Wallace and Hardy =

1944 British special forces operations

Operations Hardy & Wallace
- Part of the Western Front
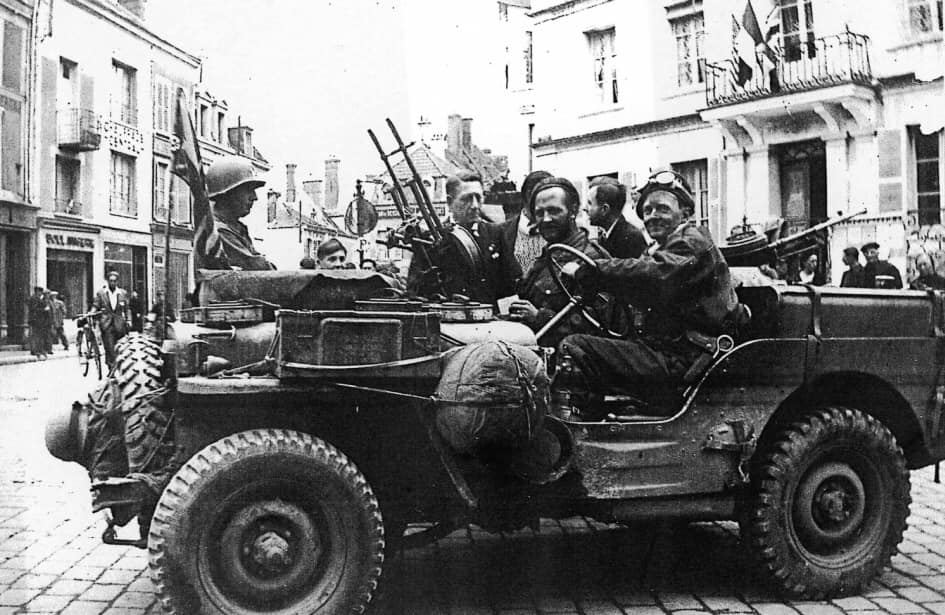
- Lieut. Carpendale (driver) at the conclusion of Op Wallace, September 1944.
Date	19 August – 19 September 1944
Location	Burgundy to the Vosges, France
Result	British victory

Belligerents
United Kingdom (Free France) FFI	Germany

Commanders and leaders
(United Kingdom) Roy Farran	(Nazi Germany) Unknown

Strength
115 men 2nd Special Air Service	Unknown

Casualties and losses
7 Killed; 8 Wounded; 2 captured (later escaped); 16 Jeeps destroyed	500 killed or wounded 59 vehicles destroyed 1 train derailed

Operations Wallace and Hardy were two British Special Air Service operations during the Second World War that took place from 27 July to 19 September 1944. Initially two sets of operations by 2nd Special Air Service, they were eventually amalgamated into one. Their objective was to disrupt German lines of communication, coordinate the activities of the French Resistance and prevent German reinforcements moving to the Normandy beachheads.

They operated from the Loire valleys, then mostly in the Forêt de Châtillon area in Burgundy and finally through to the forests of Darney to Belfort. The operation, which lasted six weeks in all, ended as they linked up with the US Seventh Army. The operations turned out to be the most successful of all the post D-Day SAS operations.

== Background ==
The Special Air Service (SAS) was a unit of the British Army, formed in July 1941 by David Stirling and originally called "L" Detachment, Special Air Service Brigade—"L" being an attempt at deception implying the existence of numerous such units. In 1944 the Special Air Service Brigade was formed and consisted of the British 1st and 2nd Special Air Service, the French 3rd and 4th Special Air Service and the Belgian 5th Special Air Service. They used specially converted American made Jeeps armed with a number of Vickers K guns, and proved so successful they kept them on.

In May 1944 the Supreme Headquarters Allied Expeditionary Force (SHAEF) had issued an order for the Special Air Service Brigade to carry out operations in France. They were to undertake parachute operations behind German lines in France, and then carry out operations supporting the Allied advance through Belgium the Netherlands, and eventually into Germany. The focus of these would be the disruption of German reinforcements from the south of France to the Normandy beachheads. The SAS also hoped to be assisted by the French resistance, with reinforcements arriving by air as well as supplies including the specially equipped Jeeps.

With the allied breakout in Normandy in August a number of operations were initiated. The Burgundy region was the hotbed for SAS activity partly because it was the centre point at which German armies would funnel their way out of France into Germany. Operation Houndsworth would set up a patrol base in the mountainous wooded countryside south west of Dijon in the Monts du Morvan. Operation Hardy would do the same in the Forêt de Châtillon area forty miles east of Auxerre to the northwest of Dijon.

== Operations ==
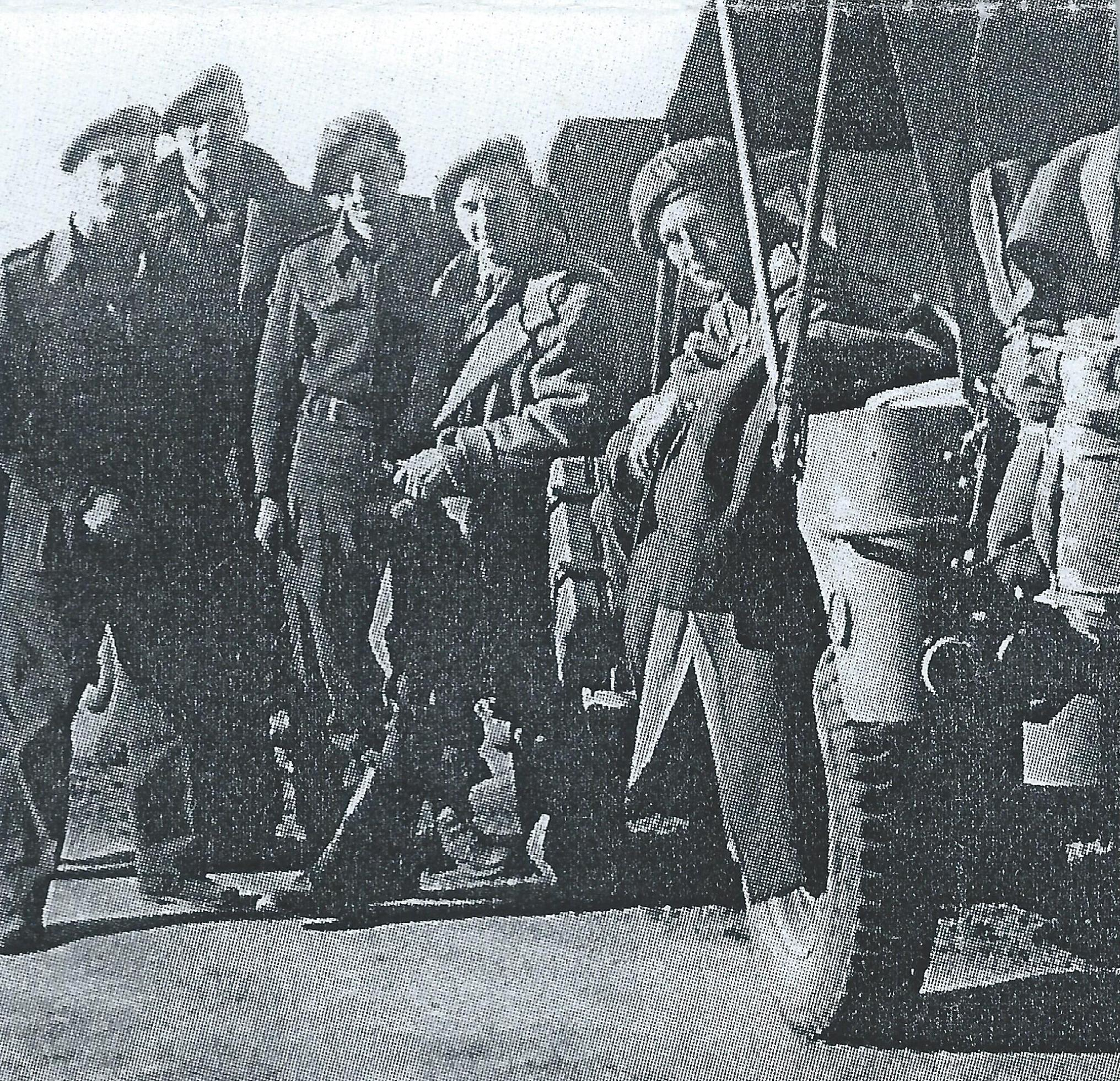
Roy Farran (seated right) in a Jeep during Operation Wallace-Hardy I August - September 1944

On 27 July Operation Hardy I commenced - 9 men and three Jeeps of 2nd Special Air Service under the command of Captain Grant Hibbert were parachuted near Châtillon-sur-Seine, dropping on to the already established 1SAS Operation Houndsworth base. They set up their base in the nearby forest and linked up with local elements of the French resistance. The previous month however 2,000 Germans swept the region and killed 37 Maquisards many of whom had been tortured. Nevertheless, Hibbert all too aware of the situation undertook reconnaissance of the German strength and dispositions in the area.

Tasked with stockpiling ammunition; fuel; supplies and galvanising the local Maquis in anticipation of the Wallace force arriving, many of his men undertook aggressive patrols against rail and road communications over which reinforcements could be moved. Crucially they blew up a stretch of railway between Dijon and Langres and decimated a German convoy which was heading towards the Normandy front.

With the Allied breakout in Normandy, it was realized that more and more Germans would be retreating through the area of SAS operations. In addition the German reinforcements for Operation Dragoon'in the South of France, would also be diverted through the region as well as its retreat. As a result, the area was to be reinforced by more SAS troopers along with members of SOE. Reinforcement parties and supplies were dropped in the same area on 8, 17, 20 and 23 August, and late in the same month the Hardy party would be joined a bigger operation - codenamed Wallace.

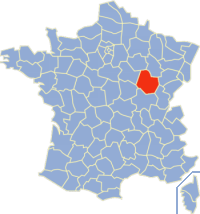
The Côte-d'Or area where Operation Wallace–Hardy I took place

On 19 August Operation Wallace commenced, under the command of Major Roy Farran. Initially 54 men landed with 18 Jeeps at Rennes airfield near the Breton capital, which was by then under Allied control. A further two jeeps and six men joined the part several days later. Two days later Farran divided his party into three groups, and ordered them to maintain a distance of thirty minutes to increase the chances of not being discovered, as well as avoiding all German resistance. The journey to Hibbert's position took Farran and his men four days and some 200 miles (320 km) behind German lines and headed to the northern bank of the river Loire. The first fifty miles were uneventful, as local French resistance fighters were able to help the SAS troopers avoid German positions. Soon after a number ran into Germans in the villages and towns, and most had to fight their way out. A number of jeeps were lost as well as eight men; some escaped and even had to get their way back to Paris and join Farran by parachute at a later date.

Now left with only seven of his original Jeeps, Farran pressed on, and as they approached the forest the column halted near a railway line. A train carrying Germans came into view; Farran ordered the engine to be targeted and it was shredded by a ferocious rate of fire from the column's Vickers K guns. The damaged engine came to a halt as the SAS men engaged the German troops in the rear of the train while the French civilians including the engine crew bailed out. As they approached their final destination they assaulted a German radar station and forced the German garrison to flee. Prisoners taken informed the SAS troopers that they believed the Jeeps to be the advance guard of General George S. Patton's United States Third Army.

Eventually the party linked with Hibbert's men at the Hardy base. Farran took command of the combined group, which consisted of a composite squadron of 60 troopers, 10 jeeps and a civilian truck, and ordered it to move to another base deeper in the forest to avoid further German scrutiny.

=== Battle of Châtillon ===
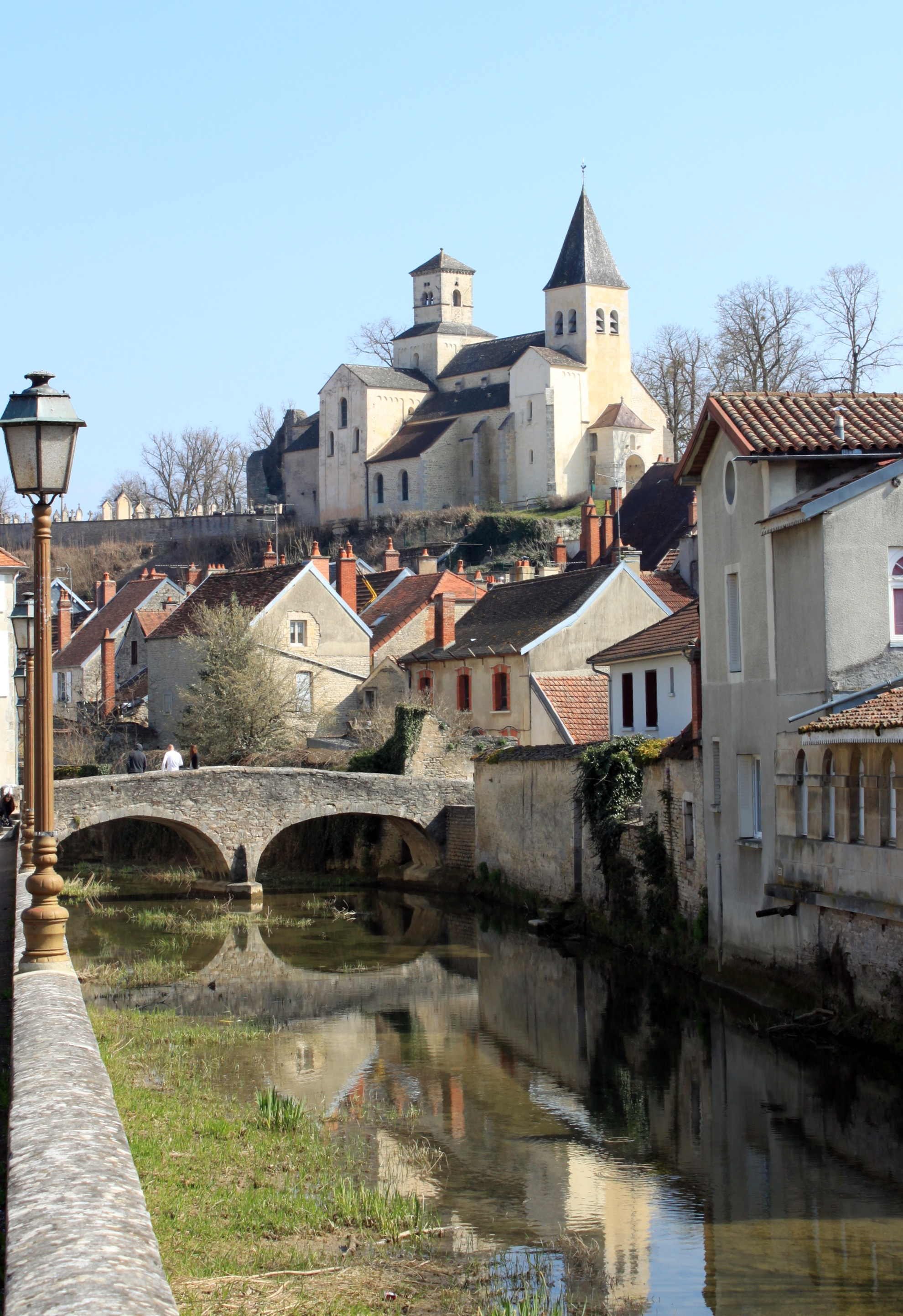
Town of Châtillon-sur-Seine

With the combined force an attack was decided to be made on the German headquarters in the town of Châtillon-sur-Seine. This town was strongly held by the Germans. An earlier meeting with Farran and the commander of the local resistance forces over a wine-fuelled dinner apparently secured an agreement that the resistance forces would aid the men of the SAS.

On September 2, in the early hours of the morning just before the attack however, there was no sign of any resistance support. Farran decided to go ahead with the attack in case of a betrayal by the French and whilst surprise was still on his side. Under the cover of darkness, Farran placed his Squadron in position, covering all the entry and exit points of the town with jeeps, machine guns or mortar positions.

At 0630 hours the attack was opened with 3-inch mortar fire on the châteaux which was the German headquarters. 48 mortar bombs were dropped on the designated targets and the SAS encountered strong resistance from the German troops in the town as a huge firefight broke out. German vehicles were set ablaze and many were cut down. Outside the town a reinforcement column of 30 vehicles full of troops was dispersed, and prevented from giving help to the garrison.

After seven and a half hours of hard fighting, Farran ordered a withdrawal to their base. The ambush was a major success for the SAS; around 100 Germans were killed and a considerable number wounded. In addition nine trucks, four cars and one motorcycle were destroyed. SAS casualties were trifling - one killed and two wounded. After the fighting, the Germans took fifty hostages thinking that this attack came from the Resistance. However the discovery of the body of one killed SAS trooper named William Holland, deliberately left by Farran, prevented their execution.

Farran soon became popular with the French locals who offered his men wine, flowers, eggs and butter.

=== End ===
The following night after the battle the SAS received a large drop from the RAF with needed supplies, ammunition but more importantly several Jeeps by parachute, bringing their total to 18 such vehicles. Farran then split his force into two columns of nine vehicles, one of these columns being led by Hibbert and the other by Farran himself, and headed for the Belfort Gap, an area between the Vosges mountains and the Swiss border. A further third party, code name Operation Robey, continued on foot in the area of Langres.

German forces were retreating to the Belfort Gap to try to prevent the Allies from reaching the Rhine river. The two columns set off on 2 September, heading for the gap between Patton's US Third Army in the north and Patch's US Seventh Army in the south. German numbers increased as more and more retreated but the SAS columns ambushed more German units over the following two weeks.

On 8 September twenty men under Lieutenant Bob Walker-Brown acting on a tip off from the Marquis ambushed five German petrol bowsers en route from Langres to Dijon. In an ambush style a motorcycle and side car and a lorry were allowed past before the lead and last vehicles were hit as the bowsers were systematically taken out and then burst into flames. With all the bowsers destroyed and having created huge palls of smoke the SAS extracted themselves successfully.

In the final week the SAS set up a base in the forest around Darney but in the coming days the Germans were fewer in number and there was hardly any resistance. Wallace came to an end on 17 September, when the groups linked up with advance elements of the US Seventh Army not far from Belfort.

== Aftermath ==
During the month they had been active, the SAS men had caused more than 500 German casualties along with 23 staff cars destroyed, 6 motor-cycles and 36 miscellaneous vehicles including trucks, half-tracks and troop carriers. In addition 100,000 tons of petrol was destroyed and a goods train burnt out. Seventeen SAS troopers had been lost including one in a parachuting accident, two had been captured but both escaped. Jeep losses were the heaviest, 16 were lost in all, some down to mechanical failure and fatal damage by parachute drops. Throughout their entire time behind German lines they were supplied by the Royal Air Force in 36 sorties, which supplied the SAS with twelve new Jeeps and 36 supply panniers.

The Germans mistook Farran's Squadron for the advance elements of the 3rd U.S. Army and thereby withdrew from Châtillon sooner than necessary, and his small force played a considerable part in disorganising the German forces in front of that army. In a December report SHAEF noted that the raid was one of the most successful actions in which a small scale harassing force behind German lines inflicted huge damage out of proportion to their numbers, with minimal losses. Farran himself claimed the raid as a perfect vindication of Stirling's original principles of the SAS - that small units behind enemy lines harassed the Germans that bought with it a strategic gain.

After linking up with American forces, Farran sent the squadron back to Paris and granted it a week's leave in the capital. Farran was awarded a Distinguished Service Order as result of Operation Wallace.

Farran and his men retrained and then re embarked to join the Italian Campaign where they prepared for Operation Tombola the following year in March which was also a resounding success.

== Bibliography ==
- Challenor, Harold; Draper, Alfred (1990). Tanky Challenor: SAS and the Met. Pen and Sword. ISBN 9780850521245.
- Gilbert, Martin (2009). The Second World War: A Complete History. Phoenix. ISBN 9780753826768.
- Hargreaves, Andrew L (2013). Special Operations in World War II: British and American Irregular Warfare Volume 39 of Campaigns and Commanders Series. University of Oklahoma Press. ISBN 9780806151250.
- Kirby, Dick (2013). The Scourge of Soho: The Controversial Career of SAS Hero Detective Sergeant Harry Challenor MM. Pen and Sword. ISBN 9781473831445.
- Lewis, Jon E (2014). The Mammoth Book of Covert Ops: True Stories of Covert Military Operations, from the Bay of Pigs to the Death of Osama bin Laden. Hachette UK. ISBN 9781780337869.
- Liddle, Peter; Bourne, J. M.; Whitehead, Ian R (2000). The Great World War 1914-45: Lightning strikes twice. HarperCollins. ISBN 9780004724546.
- Macintyre, Ben (2017). Summary and Analysis of Rogue Heroes: The History of the SAS, Britain's Secret Special Forces Unit That Sabotaged the Nazis and Changed the Nature of War. Open Road Media. ISBN 9781504044950.
- Mortimer, Gavin (2015). The SAS in World War II. Bloomsbury Publishing. ISBN 9781472808776.
- Shortt, James; McBride, Angus (1981). The Special Air Service. Osprey Publishing. ISBN 0-85045-396-8.
- Thompson, Major General Julian (1999). The Imperial War Museum: War Behind Enemy Lines. Pan Grand. ISBN 0-330-36761-7.
- Thompson, Leroy (1999). SAS : Great Britain's Elite Special Air Service. MBI. ISBN 9781610607421.
- Young, Irene (1990). Enigma variations: a memoir of love and war. Mainstream. ISBN 1-85158-294-0.
- Davies, Steven (2025). SAS Behind the Lines: Operations Hardy & Wallace. ISBN 979-8-2944-1079-7
