= Vickers K machine gun =

Vickers Gas Operated
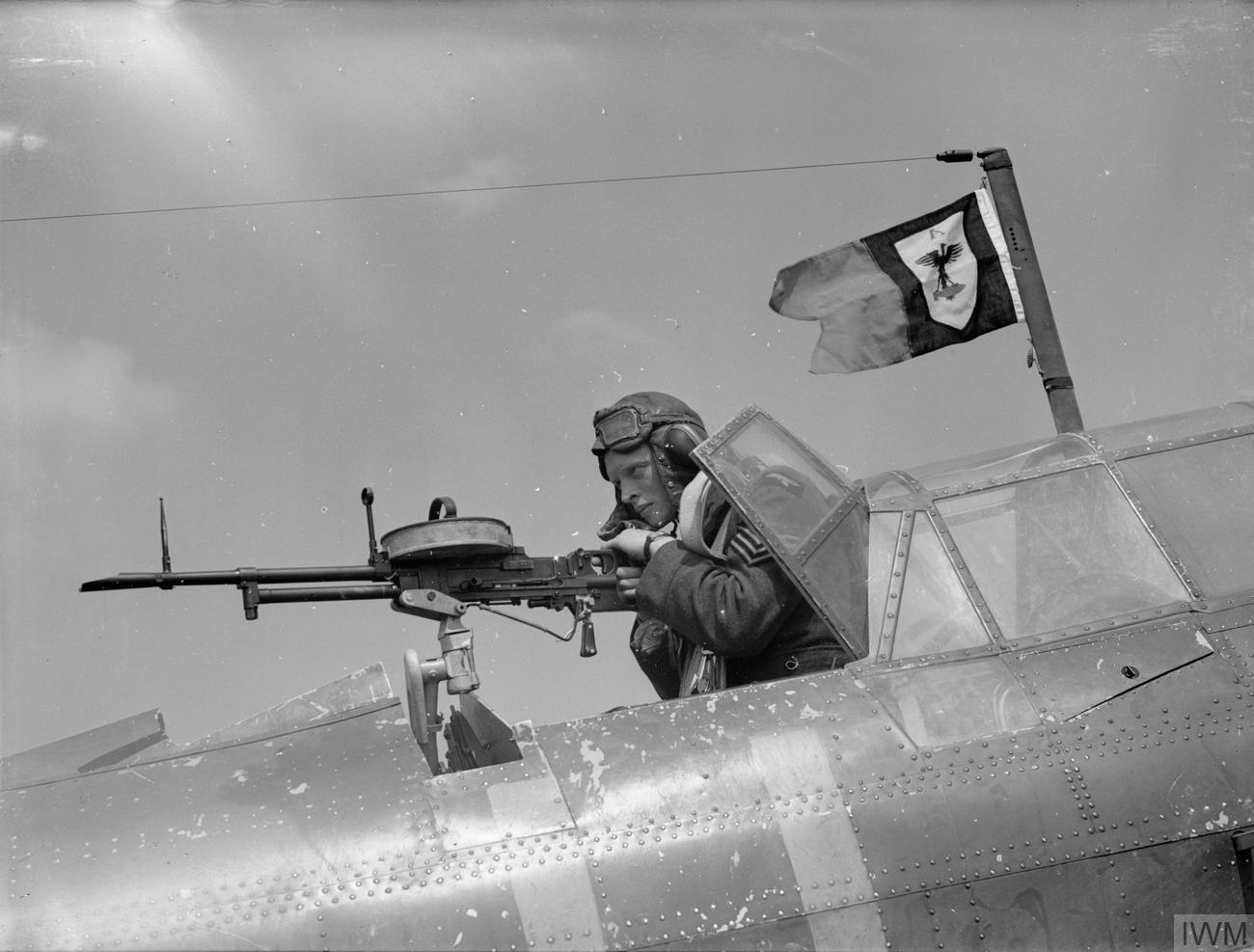
- Used on a Fairey Battle light bomber
- Type: Machine gun
- Place of origin: United Kingdom

Service history
- Used by: United Kingdom
- Wars: World War II

Production history
- Designed: 1935
- Manufacturer: Vickers-Armstrongs
- Variants: See Variants

Specifications
- Mass: 29.5 lb (13.4 kg)
- Length: 37 in (0.93 m)
- Barrel length: 20.8 inches (529 mm)
- Cartridge: .303 British
- Calibre: .303 in
- Action: Gas operated
- Rate of fire: 950-1,200 round/min
- Muzzle velocity: 2,500 ft/s (760 m/s)
- Feed system: pan 60/100 rounds
- Sights: Iron

The Vickers K machine gun, known as the Vickers Gas Operated (Vickers G.O.) or Gun, Machine, Vickers G.O. .303-inch in British service, was a rapid-firing machine gun developed and manufactured for use in aircraft by Vickers-Armstrongs. The high rate of fire was needed for the short period of time when the gunner would be able to fire at an attacking aircraft. The weapon was adopted for land use during World War II.

== Development ==
The Vickers K was a development of the Vickers-Berthier (VB) light machine gun, adopted in 1932 by the Indian Army. The VB, like the Bren light machine gun, used a locking tilting breechblock. Unlike the Bren, the VB locked its breech only at the last moment of forward travel. With lighter moving parts and the VB locking design, the Vickers K had an adjustable rate of fire between 950 and 1,200 rounds per minute; faster than the German MG34.

The weapon was adopted for British service as the VGO. It was test-flown with a large 300-round pan magazine, and beat the .303 Browning in reliability. However, the wide pan made it difficult to fit into fighter wings and would have interfered with wing structures. When the belt-fed Browning Mark II was selected as the standard machine-gun armament for RAF aircraft, the VGO became redundant for the RAF. These guns found secondary use in many roles. It continued to be used by the Fleet Air Arm until 1945.

== Variants ==
Some were made in 7.7mm for the Belgians before the war and at least one example of the ground variant survives in a Brussels museum.

=== VGO No.1 Mk.1. ===
The Vickers class K/Vickers G.O. machine gun is a gas-operated weapon, firing from an open bolt (thus making it non-synchronizable for firing through a spinning propeller) in full automatic mode only. Its gas cylinder is located below the barrel, and a long-stroke gas piston operates a vertically tilting bolt. Feed is from top-mounted flat pan magazines with a nominal capacity of 100 rounds, although it was customary to load only 96 or 97 rounds to ensure reliable feeding. The gun is fitted with a spade grip at the rear of receiver, with a trigger to control fire. In ground use, it was normally mounted on single or twin pintle mounts on various jeeps and trucks.

=== Vickers GO No.2 Mk.1 Land Service ===
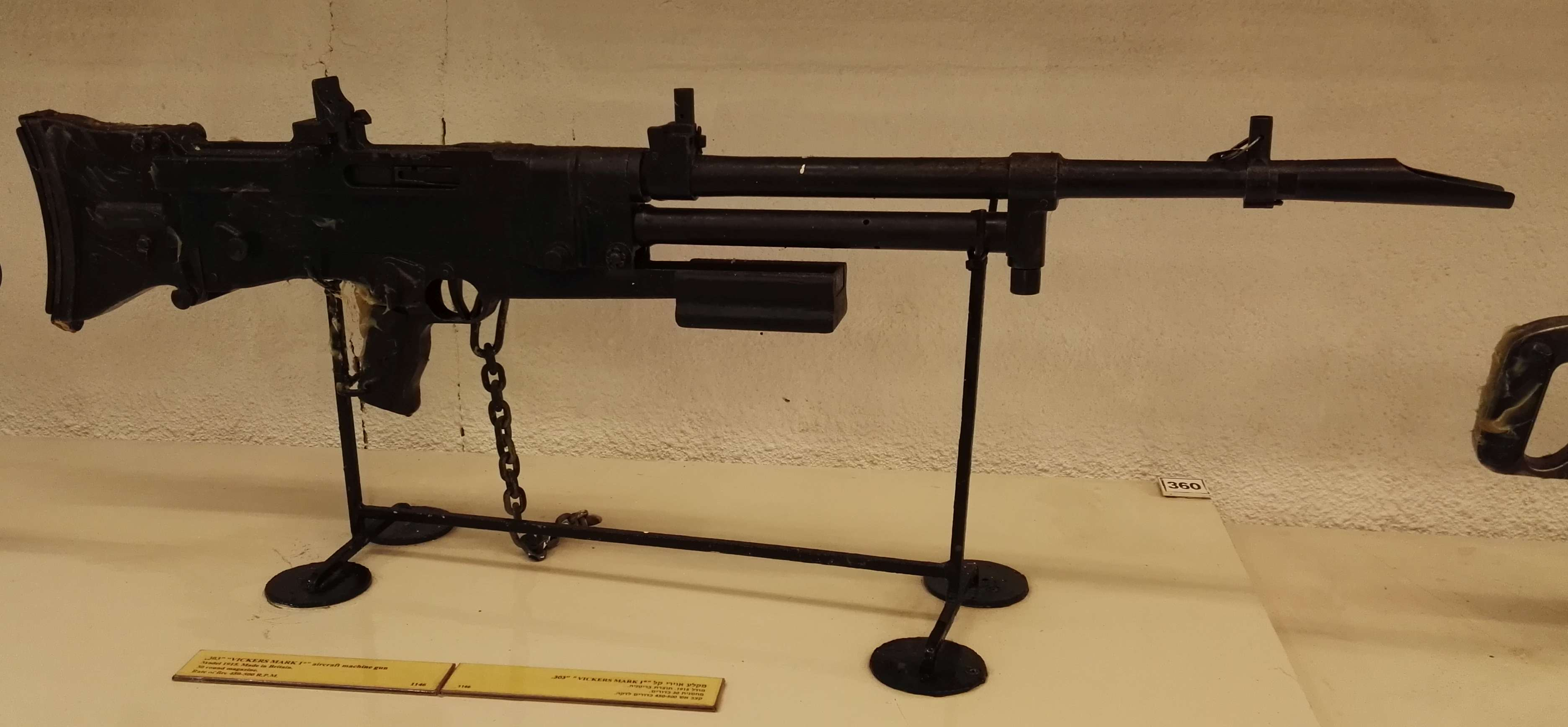
A Vickers GO No.2 Mk.1 Land Service without its pan magazine in Batey ha-Osef Museum, Tel Aviv, Israel.

Originally intended for RAF airfield defence units, these guns were remanufactured from original Vickers G.O. No.1 Mk.1 aircraft guns. A number of these ‘Vickers G.O. Land Service’ machine guns found their way to a variety of British commando and reconnaissance units which operated in Europe during 1944 and 1945. The Land variant has the spade grip replaced with a "semi bullpup" short stock at the rear and a pistol grip with trigger below the receiver. A short forend or a folding carrying handle are added below the gas cylinder, and a folding bipod is attached to the gas block. New iron sights are provided on folding bases.

=== Vickers G.O. Camera Gun ===
A camera gun version was made for training. The body was of cast metal. The grip and trigger mechanism were realistic. Gunners in training exposed film when "shooting" at attacking aircraft and these images were analysed later. This was a technique developed in World War I with Lewis Camera Guns.

== Combat use ==
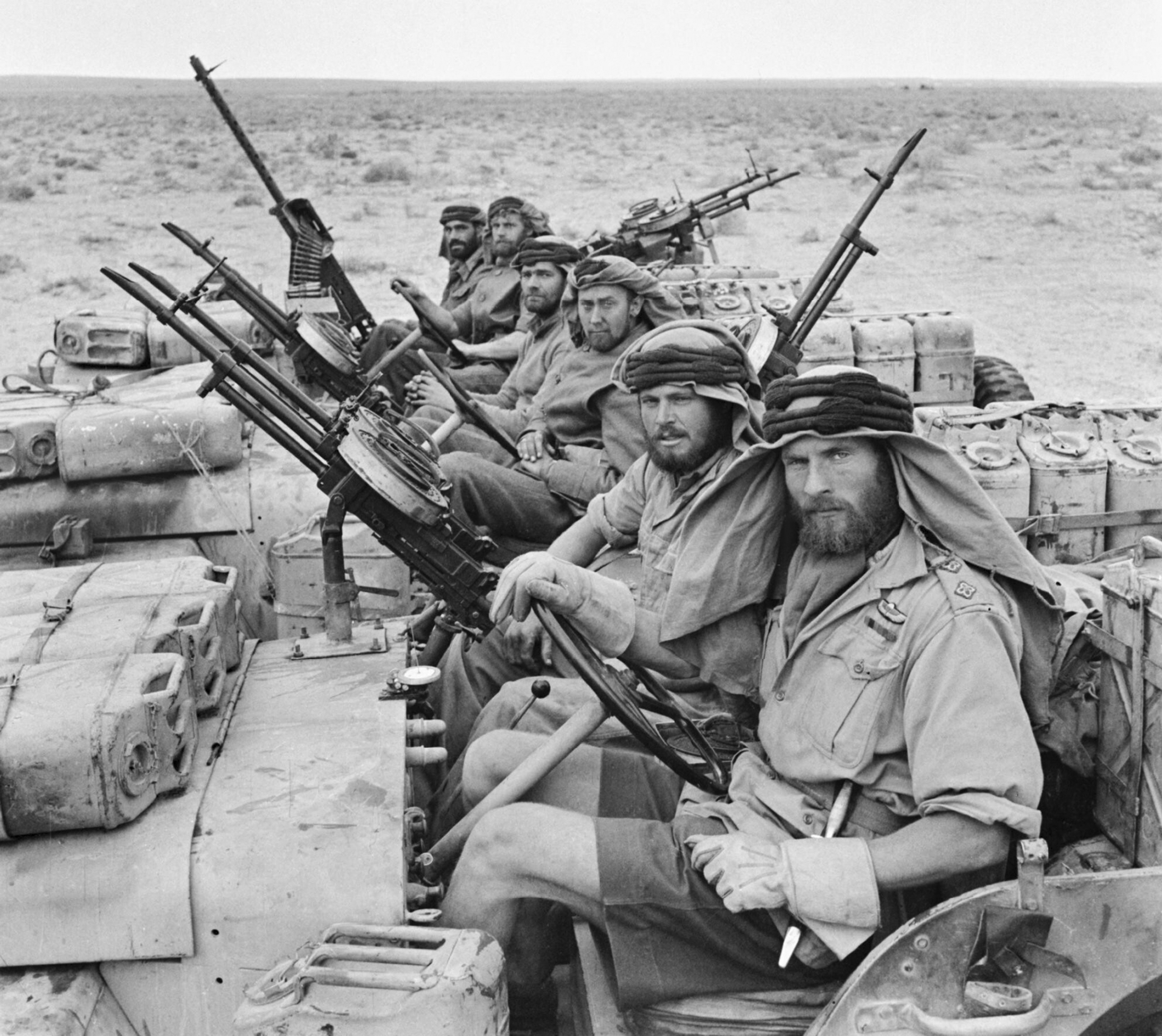
SAS returning from a 1943 patrol in North Africa with their twin-mounted Vickers K machine guns.

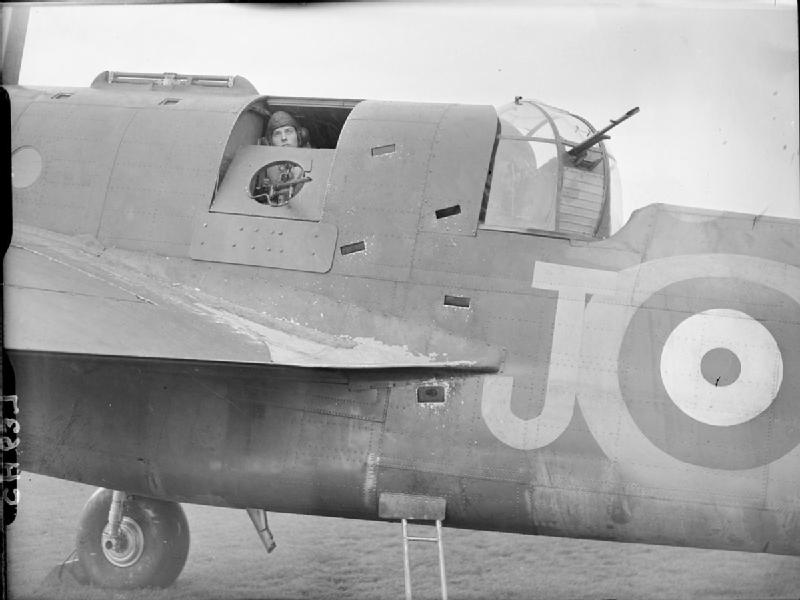
Beaufort L4461 'OA-J', of No. 22 Squadron RAF. The turret has a Vickers K machine gun; for protection against beam attacks, another K gun is mounted in the port entry hatch.

The Vickers K was fitted to light and medium bombers in RAF service such as the Fairey Battle and Handley Page Hampden. It was also used in gun turrets, such as the dorsal turret in the Bristol Blenheim, the nose turret in the Armstrong Whitworth Whitley and the rear of the cockpit in the Fairey Battle. It was the standard Royal Navy Fleet Air Arm "Telegraphist Air Gunner" machine gun, on British built carrier Torpedo Strike Reconnaissance aircraft - the Fairey Swordfish, the Fairey Albacore and the Fairey Barracuda. As supplies of air-cooled .303 in (7.7 mm) Browning machine guns increased the Vickers G.O. was phased out of use with the RAF. These machine guns were then reallocated from RAF stocks to units of the British and Commonwealth armies. The gun continued in service with the Fleet Air Arm and its last recorded use by the navy was by 812 Squadron RNAS Barracudas in anti piracy patrols off Hong Kong in October 1945.

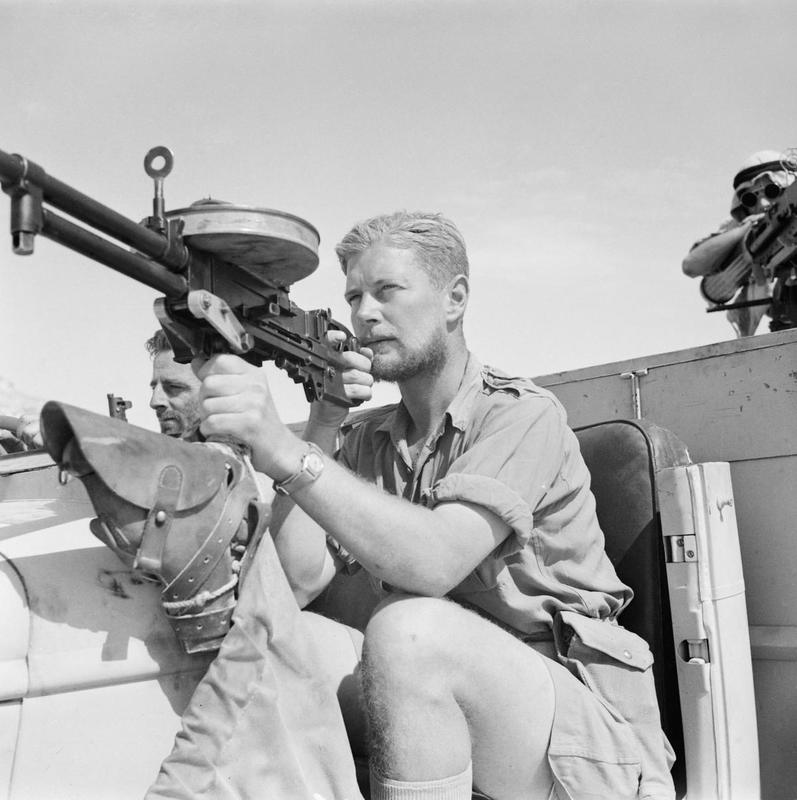
A member of a Long Range Desert Group (LRDG) patrol poses with a Vickers 'K' Gas-operated machine gun on a Chevrolet 30-cwt truck, May 1942.

The Long Range Desert Group was supplied with large numbers of the Vickers G.O. for use on its vehicles. They were used in single or custom built twin mountings. The Special Air Service adopted it for their hit and run tactics, mounting it in pairs on their jeeps. Over the years, it was assumed by some that the latter services took the phased-out VGO because they could obtain no other suitable machine guns but with its high rate of fire and low-friction locking design (which proved resistant to jams from sand), the LRDG and SAS found the G.O. markedly superior to either the .303 in (7.7 mm) water-cooled Vickers or the Bren gun. In a similar manner, the Airborne Reconnaissance Squadron of the Reconnaissance Corps mounted the VGO on jeeps when they were attached to the 1st Airborne Division during Operation Market-Garden in September 1944. Royal Marine and Army Commandos used the VGO for infantry support/squad automatic weapon briefly around D-Day.

In the Coastal Forces of the Royal Navy, the Vickers K began to replace the Lewis gun on board Motor Torpedo Boats, Motor Launches and other light craft, from 1942.

== See also ==
- MG 81 machine gun
- ShKAS machine gun
