= Search and destroy =

Military strategy

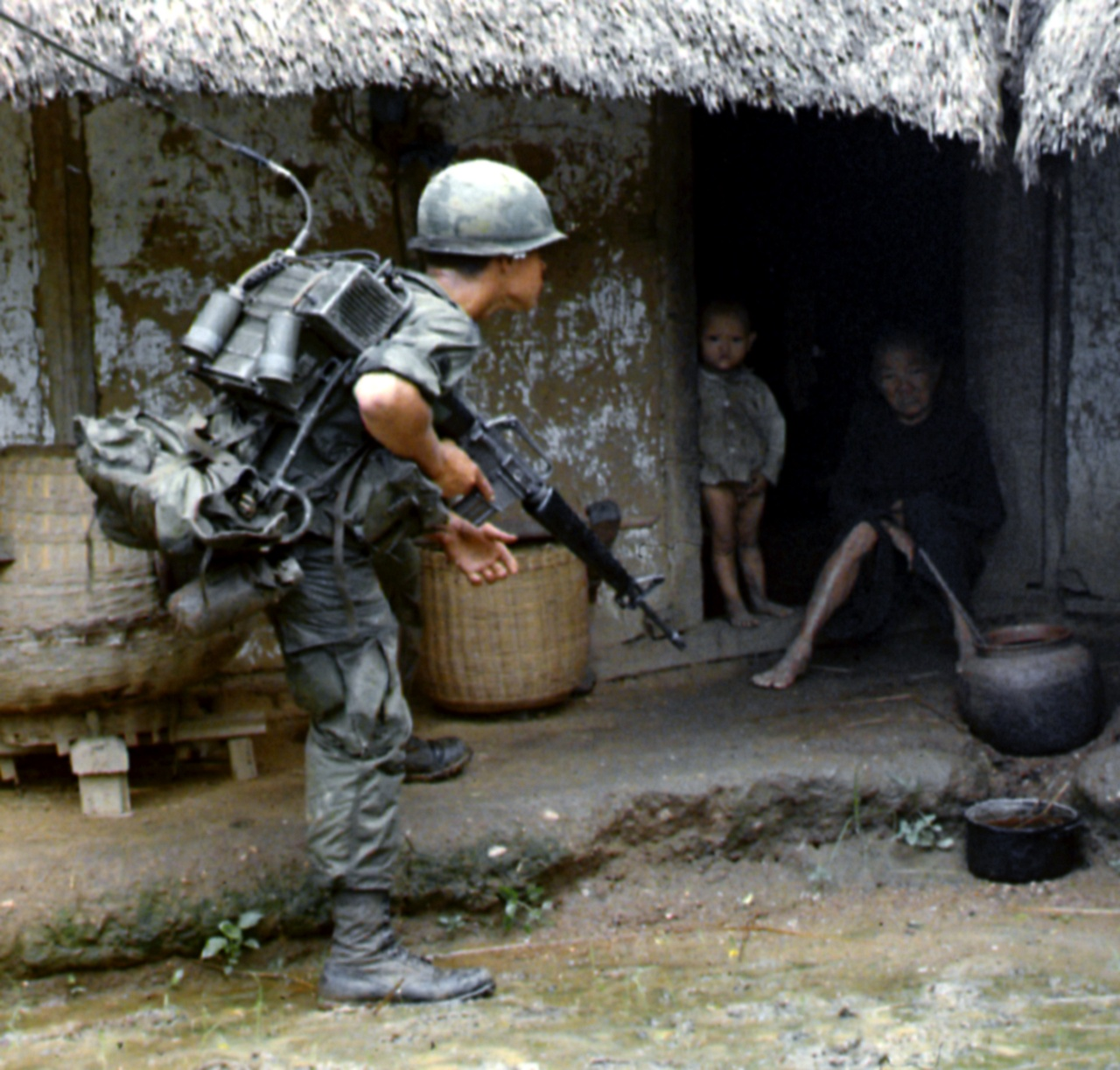
An American soldier searching a Vietnamese house for Viet Cong guerrillas during the Vietnam War.

Seek and destroy (also known as search and destroy, or S&D) is a military strategy which consists of inserting infantry forces into hostile territory and directing them to search and then attack enemy targets before immediately withdrawing. First used as part of counterinsurgency operations during military conflicts in Southeast Asia such as the Malayan Emergency and the Vietnam War, the strategy was developed to take advantage of new technological capabilities available to Western militaries such as the helicopter, which allowed for the adoption of new tactics like the air assault.

Primarily used in jungle warfare, the strategy was developed with asymmetric tactics in mind rather than conventional warfare. A related strategy known as clear and hold, which entailed military forces clearing an area of enemy personnel and then keeping the area clear of enemies while winning the local population's support, was developed around the same period and used alongside the search and destroy strategy. Body counts were commonly used to determine the success of the strategy, which entailed fighting a war of attrition against an insurgency.

== Malayan Emergency ==
During the Malayan Emergency, British forces conducted numerous search and destroy (S&D) operations in the Malayan countryside (which largely consisted of jungles) to flush out Malayan National Liberation Army (MNLA) guerrillas. The Ferret Force, a short-lived British counterinsurgency (COIN) unit which existed from July to December 1948, served as an important source of military intelligence for S&D missions against the MNLA. Ferret Force personnel would gather intelligence, including from native informants and prisoners, as to the whereabouts of MNLA insurgents, which would then be provided to troops assigned to S&D operations. Once MNLA insurgents had been flushed out, they would then be further harassed via asymmetric warfare tactics such as being denied sources of food and shelter, before either surrendering or being killed in a direct military engagement, most commonly an ambush.

Ultimately, many British officials came to the conclusion that their S&D tactics were working poorly. Troops assigned to S&D missions would often use heavy-handed tactics on individuals and settlements suspected of supporting the MNLA, alienating the local population. MNLA insurgents held numerous advantages over their British opponents, including residing in closer proximity to the countryside's population and having familial relations or close friendships among local villagers. While MNLA insurgents rarely directly engaged British forces, they frequently targeted civilians to elicit material support. Patrols in the jungle, a common part of British S&D operations, were unpopular with the troops due to having to spend significant periods of time navigating unfamiliar terrain filled with dangerous animals and insects while concomitantly watching out for MNLA ambushes. British forces, unable to distinguish friend from foe, had to adjust to the constant risk of an insurgent attack. These fears led to incidents such as the Batang Kali massacre, in which 24 unarmed villagers were killed by soldiers of the Scots Guards regiment.

== Vietnam War ==
Search and destroy became an offensive tool that was crucial to General William Westmoreland's second phase during the Vietnam War. In his three-phase strategy, the first was to tie down the Viet Cong, the second phase was to resume the offensive and destroy the enemy, and the third phase was to restore the area under South Vietnamese government control. Most "Zippo" missions (so named for the Zippo lighters used to set fire to villages believed to be aligned with the Viet Cong) were assigned to the second phase around 1966 and 1967, along with clear-and-secure operations. Search-and-destroy missions entailed sending out platoons, companies, or larger detachments of US troops from a fortified position to locate and destroy communist units in the countryside. These missions most commonly involved hiking out into the "boonies" and setting an ambush in the brush, near a suspected Viet Cong trail. The ambush typically involved the use of fixed Claymore antipersonnel mines, crossing lines of small arms fire, mortar support, and possibly additional artillery support called in via radio from a nearby fire support base.

In February 1967, some of the largest Zippo missions were conducted in the Iron Triangle, between Saigon and Routes 13 and 25. The area had a mass centre of Viet Cong logistics and headquarters, with some of the most high-ranking NLF officials stationed there. The offensive began with Operation Junction City, where the American units assigned had destroyed hundreds of tons of rice, killed 720 guerrillas, and captured 213 prisoners. However, the number of defenders in the Iron Triangle area was thought to be over 10,000. The offensive failed to destroy the NLF's headquarters or to capture any high-ranking officers and so it had little effect toward Hanoi's plan. Both search-and-destroy and clear-and-hold missions stretched into the third phase, which began in 1968. The number of missions mounted, especially after the US was hit by General Võ Nguyên Giáp's Tet Offensive in 1968. As the war grew more aggressive, so did the missions, and search-and-destroy and clear-and-secure operations became merged.

Search-and-destroy missions had many flaws. First, there was lack of distinction between clearing and search-and-destroy missions. Thus, clearing missions, which were less aggressive, eventually morphed into a more violent and brutal form of tactic, just as search-and-destroy missions were. With the lack of distinction between clearing, and search-and-destroy missions, pacification was not pushed. Such a response led to the Mỹ Lai massacre of 1968, where American troops massacred at least 347 Vietnamese civilians. Guenter Lewy, a professor of Political Science at the University of Massachusetts Amherst, argued that the generals and war planners severely underestimated the enemy's abilities to match and even to exceed US forces. Large numbers of Viet Cong troops would be killed or captured, but they were quickly replaced. Enemy forces were initially pushed out of certain territories, but as soon as the American forces left the areas, they simply returned with more reinforcements and weapons.

The effectiveness of the missions is also doubtful. In one of the first search-and-destroy missions northwest of Dầu Tiếng, named Operation Attleboro, a US report states that 115 U.S. soldiers were killed, and the North Vietnamese lost 1,062. In Operation Junction City, the report also states that 282 US soldiers were killed, and the Viet Cong lost 1,728 guerrillas. Those estimated figures, however, should be considered in light of how they were obtained. They were almost exclusively gathered by indirect means: sensor readings, sightings of secondary explosions, reports of defectors or prisoners of war, and inference or extrapolation.

== See also ==
- List of established military terms

== Sources ==
- Starry, Donn A. GEN. Mounted Combat In Vietnam; Vietnam Studies. Department of the Army, 1978.
- Terry, Wallace (1984). Bloods: An Oral History of the Vietnam War by Black Veterans. Random House. ISBN 0394530284. (ISBN 978-0-394-53028-4), e.g., pages 3–17.
