= Malayan Scouts (Special Air Service Regiment) =

Special forces units during the Malayan Emergency (1948–1960)

- Founded: June 1950
- Disbanded: 1960 (End of the Malayan Emergency)
- Country: Malaya / British Malaya (1950–December 1951); United Kingdom (from 22 December 1951)
- Branch: Federation of Malaya security forces (1950–December 1951); British Army (from 22 December 1951)
- Type: Special forces
- Size: 5 combat squadrons, 1 manhunt squadron, and 3 support company (HQ, Logistics, and Intelligence)
- Part of: Malaya Command
- Headquarters: Sungai Besi, Kuala Lumpur
- Nicknames: Malayan Scouts (SAS), Malay Scouts, Tentera Bersayap (Malay for 'Winged Soldiers')
- Engagements: Malayan Emergency; Operation Helsby; Operation Copley; Operation Eagle; Operation Commodore; Operation Sword; Operation Termite; Operation Unity

Commanders
- Notable commanders: Mike Calvert, George Lea, Tony Deane-Drummond

The Malayan Scouts (Special Air Service Regiment), generally known as the Malayan Scouts, was an ad hoc special forces unit raised in 1950 by the British protectorate authorities during the Malayan Emergency. (Note: Malaya gained independence from the British in 1957. In 1950, it was still a British colony, collectively known as British Malaya. However, since 1948, it had begun transitioning into a self-governing entity known as the Federation of Malaya. Despite the different terms, both "British Malaya" and "Federation of Malaya" referred to the same territory during this period.) The unit was primarily tasked with counter-insurgency and irregular warfare within the Federation of Malaya, specifically focusing on long-range penetration and special reconnaissance in dense rainforest and mountainous terrain. Their core objective was to locate and neutralise insurgents of the Malayan National Liberation Army (MNLA), the armed wing of the Malayan Communist Party.

The unit was established as a successor to Ferret Force, an earlier experimental counter-insurgency group that had been disbanded. Although the 21st Special Air Service Regiment (21 SAS) existed as a Territorial Army unit in the United Kingdom at the time, the Malayan Scouts initially operated as an independent entity without formal affiliation to the SAS. (Note: At the time of its establishment, the Malayan Scouts had no direct affiliation with the SAS, aside from the fact that its founder, Mike Calvert, had served as an SAS commander during World War II. The unit was not a branch or offshoot of the SAS; rather, it was primarily composed of veteran special forces personnel, many of whom had previously served with SOE’s Force 136 or the Chindits.) Following their demonstrated effectiveness in jungle operations and deep-penetration raids, the British Army formally incorporated the unit into its order of battle on 22 December 1951. At this point, the unit was officially designated as the 22nd Special Air Service Regiment (22 SAS).

Despite this official change in nomenclature, the unit continued to be referred to as the Malayan Scouts for the duration of their deployment in Malaya. The 22 SAS designation became the primary identity of the unit only after its headquarters moved from RAF Kuala Lumpur, Sungai Besi, to Worcestershire in 1958, and subsequently to Herefordshire in 1960.

The performance of the Malayan Scouts was instrumental in the survival of the Special Air Service as a permanent part of the British Army. Following the end of the Second World War, the British government had intended to disband the SAS entirely. The Scouts' successes during the Emergency proved the utility of specialised units in modern, unconventional conflicts.

The unit also provided the foundational framework for the creation of several Commonwealth special forces. The Australian Special Air Service Regiment (SASR), the New Zealand Special Air Service (NZSAS), and the Rhodesian Special Air Service all trace their operational origins or structural models back to the Malayan Scouts.

== History ==
=== Origins and the Ferret Force ===
Following the end of the Second World War in 1945, the British administration in Malaya faced a rising insurgency led by the Malayan Communist Party (MCP). The MCP's armed wing, the Malayan Peoples' Anti-Japanese Army (MPAJA), which had acted as a British ally during the Japanese occupation, was reorganised as the Malayan Peoples' Anti-British Army and later renamed the Malayan National Liberation Army (MNLA). These insurgents targeted the colonial economy by attacking rubber plantations, tin mines, and government infrastructure.

The conflict escalated significantly in June 1948 following the assassination of three European plantation managers in Sungai Siput, Perak, which prompted the declaration of a state of emergency. To counter the MNLA's proficiency in guerrilla warfare, Lieutenant Colonel Walter Walker proposed a specialised unit capable of operating deep within the jungle. This led to the formation of Ferret Force in July 1948. Composed of former Force 136 personnel, the Royal Malay Regiment, and the Gurkha Rifles, the force was highly successful in its brief existence and destroyed numerous insurgent camps. However, due to political sensitivities and a temporary preference for negotiation over military action, Ferret Force was disbanded in December 1948. (Note: British administration in Malaya was hesitant to support military action against the MRLA, preferring instead to win over insurgents through negotiations. There were also concerns that some former Force 136 members might sympathise with the MCP because of their wartime alliance.)

=== Calvert's assessment and the Briggs Plan ===
As the security situation deteriorated, General Sir John Harding sought expert advice on unconventional warfare. Major Michael "Mad Mike" Calvert, a veteran of the Chindits and former commander of the SAS Brigade, was tasked with assessing the insurgency. Calvert spent six months conducting a covert survey of the region, reportedly travelling 1,500 miles (2,400 km) and gathering intelligence from various local sources.

Calvert's findings were presented to Lieutenant General Harold Briggs, the Director of Operations. Calvert argued for the reintroduction of a long-range penetration unit capable of living and fighting in the jungle for extended periods. These recommendations became a core component of the Briggs Plan, a comprehensive counter-insurgency strategy that also included the forced relocation of rural populations into New Villages to cut off insurgent supply lines.

=== Formation of the Malayan Scouts ===
In 1950, Calvert received permission to raise the Malayan Scouts (Special Air Service Regiment). Initially, the unit was a local security force under Malaya Command, which restricted Calvert to recruiting personnel already stationed in the Far East. The founding intake, known as A Squadron, consisted of former Chindits, Ferret Force veterans, and volunteers from various units in the region, including a small group of deserters from the French Foreign Legion.

As the unit's value became apparent, recruitment was expanded beyond Malaya. In 1951, B Squadron was formed from Z Squadron of the 21 SAS, (Note: The Z Squadron of 21 SAS was later renamed M Squadron, 21 SAS, with "M" standing for "Malaya Squadron". As a result, some publications refer to it as Z Squadron, while others use M Squadron—both names referring to the same unit.) while C Squadron was raised in Southern Rhodesia from a pool of 1,000 volunteers, many of whom were veterans of the Second World War.

The unit faced early disciplinary challenges. The original A Squadron was noted for its unconventional and often unprofessional behaviour, which caused friction with the more traditionally disciplined B and C Squadrons. In late 1951, Calvert was evacuated to the UK because of ill health, and command passed to Lieutenant Colonel John Sloane. Sloane, an infantry officer, implemented stricter military discipline and oversaw the relocation of the unit's headquarters to Sungai Besi, near Kuala Lumpur.

=== Operational innovations and heliborne warfare ===
The Malayan Scouts were pioneers in the use of rotary-wing aircraft for special operations. In February 1952, during Operation Helsby, the unit conducted one of the first major heliborne assaults in military history. Approximately 60 troopers from B Squadron were inserted by parachute and helicopter into the Belum Valley near the Malaya–Thailand border. The operation demonstrated the effectiveness of helicopters for medical evacuation and rapid deployment in inaccessible terrain, a tactic that predated the widespread use of airmobile warfare in the Vietnam War by a decade.

=== Integration as the 22nd Special Air Service Regiment ===
By late 1951, the Scouts were regarded by Far East Land Forces as the most valuable asset in the conflict. Consequently, on 22 December 1951, the unit was formally integrated into the British Army as the 22nd Special Air Service Regiment. While they adopted the SAS cap badge and the maroon beret of the Parachute Regiment, they remained colloquially known as the Malayan Scouts for several years.

Throughout the mid-1950s, the regiment continued to expand, incorporating volunteers from New Zealand and Australia. Although a request from General Gerald Templer to raise a second regiment was declined, he instead authorised the recruitment of indigenous Orang Asli trackers to support SAS operations.

=== Relocation and legacy ===
In November 1958, as the Malayan Emergency drew toward its conclusion, the headquarters of 22 SAS moved from Sungai Besi to Worcestershire, and later to Stirling Lines in Herefordshire. Though the Emergency officially ended in 1960, the SAS maintained a squadron in Malaya to oversee the Jungle Warfare Training School and conduct deep-forest patrols. The success of the Malayan Scouts not only ensured the continued existence of the SAS within the British Army but also served as the blueprint for the Australian SASR and New Zealand SAS.

== Structures ==
=== During the Malayan Emergency ===
Structure of the Malayan Scouts (SAS) as of 1955
Name	Functions/Roles	EST.	Notes
A Section (later HQ Company)	Administrative and operational support	1950	
Q Section	Logistics, acquisition, and ordnances support	1950	
Int Section	Intelligence and training support	1950	
A Squadron	Special forces	1950	
B Squadron	Special forces	1951	
C Squadron	Special forces	1951	
D Squadron	Special forces	1955	
Independent Parachute Regiment Squadron	Special forces	1955	
SAS Auxiliary Forces (Senoi Praaq)	Special forces (tracker)	1955	

==== A Section ====
The A Section, short for Administration Section, served as the headquarters company of the Malayan Scouts. Established in 1950, it was one of the four original components of the unit. As the name suggests, it was responsible for both administrative and operational support. Over time, A Section evolved into the Headquarters Company of the 22nd Special Air Service Regiment (HQ Coy, 22 SAS).

In the early days of the Malayan Scouts, the unit was initially seen as a temporary formation. Consequently, the personnel assigned to A Section and Q Section by the Malayan Command, often did not meet Major Mike Calvert's high standards. Nevertheless, Calvert made the most of the available manpower, provided the unit remained effective in operations. After the formal integration of the Malayan Scouts into the British Army in 1951, both sections saw an influx of more capable and experienced personnel.

==== Q Section ====
The Q Section, short for Quartermaster Section, was tasked with logistics and supply duties for the Malayan Scouts. Like A Section, it was one of the four founding elements of the unit, established in 1950.

In its early days, Q Section faced significant logistical challenges, as the Malayan Scouts lacked sufficient assets to sustain operations during the Malayan Emergency. However, as the unit gained support from the British military and Commonwealth allies, including helicopter and aeroplane support, its logistical capabilities improved considerably.

==== Int Section ====
Established in 1950, the Int Section (short for Intelligence Section) was another founding component of the Malayan Scouts. Major Calvert personally recruited Captain John Woodhouse of the Dorset Regiment, who was then serving as G3 Intelligence for the 40th Division in Hong Kong, to lead the section as its first officer commanding (OC). (Note: In British and Commonwealth military tradition, the term commanding officer (CO) is reserved for the commander of a regiment or battalion, while officer commanding (OC) refers to the leader of sub-units and smaller formations such as companies, squadrons, and batteries.) In addition to its military intelligence responsibilities, the Int Section also played a key role in conducting selection and training for the Malayan Scouts.

To mitigate the risk of infiltration by Communist agents or sympathisers, Calvert and Woodhouse enlisted several Chinese interpreters from Hong Kong. Most members of this section were drawn from the Special Branch of the British Military Administration (Malaya), consisting primarily of European and Malay intelligence officers stationed in Johor. (Note: Calvert and Woodhouse did not have to look far to recruit members for the Intelligence Section of the Malayan Scouts. Most were drawn from military and law enforcement agencies already stationed in Johor, where the unit's headquarters was located.) (Note: The Special Branch was officially absorbed into the Federal Malayan Police Force in 1952. Prior to that, it operated directly under the British Military Administration of Malaya.) In his 1964 book, Fighting Mad: One Man's Guerrilla War, Calvert praised Woodhouse and the Int Section, describing them as the best recruits he had secured for the Malayan Scouts.

==== A Squadron ====
Established in 1950, A Squadron was the first combat unit of the Malayan Scouts. Because of initial recruitment restrictions, Major Calvert was only permitted to enlist personnel already stationed in the Far East. As a result, A Squadron was primarily composed of former members of the Chindits—a special forces unit of the British Indian Army during World War II—and veterans of Ferret Force, which included former Special Operations Executive (SOE) agents and jungle warfare specialists from the Royal Malay Regiment and the Gurkha Rifles.

Additionally, Calvert recruited deserters from the French Foreign Legion—soldiers stranded in French Indochina who refused to return to their unit after the war. He also brought in former SAS members who had served under him when he commanded the Special Air Service Troops at the end of the war. As a result, A Squadron became a multinational special forces unit, featuring a unique blend of mercenaries and regular military personnel.

Many of the original members returned to their home countries after completing their two-year service in the Malayan Scouts. However, some chose to remain, transferring to other squadrons to help standardise training and operational effectiveness across the unit.

==== B Squadron ====
Formed in 1951, B Squadron was created by absorbing the newly established Z Squadron of the 21st Special Air Service Regiment. Although initially intended for deployment to the Korean War, the squadron was instead redirected to Malaya. This unit marked the first time that Calvert was granted permission by the British Malayan colonial government to recruit personnel from outside the Far East. During its training phase under Calvert's command, the squadron was renamed M Squadron, 21 SAS, with "M" standing for "Malaya Squadron".

Upon completing its training, the squadron was fully absorbed into the Malayan Scouts and reorganised as B Squadron, Malayan Scouts (SAS). It was later redesignated as B Squadron, 22 SAS, when the Malayan Scouts were officially integrated into the British Army in December 1951. Unlike A Squadron, which consisted of experienced veterans, many members of B Squadron were reservists with no prior combat experience, having enlisted after World War II. The squadron's first officer commanding was Major Anthony Greville-Bell.

==== C Squadron ====
After recruiting personnel in Britain, Calvert travelled to Southern Rhodesia, where he received over 1,000 applications from the Rhodesia region. After a rigorous selection process, 120 World War II veterans were chosen and brought to Malaya, where they were retrained as special forces operators and designated as C Squadron, Malayan Scouts (SAS). The first OC of C Squadron was Major Peter Walls. The unit was later redesignated as C (Rhodesia) Squadron, 22 SAS. It was dissolved in March 1953 when its members returned to Rhodesia at the end of their tour of duty.

At the end of 1955, following a major recruitment drive across three Commonwealth nations, C Squadron was reformed with soldiers recruited entirely from New Zealand. It was officially renamed C (New Zealand) Squadron, 22 SAS. Approximately one-third of its members were Māori, and its first OC after reformation was Major Frank Rennie.

==== D Squadron ====
Officially named D (Australia) Squadron, 22 SAS, this squadron was composed entirely of Australian recruits as part of the 1955 Commonwealth recruitment drive. It was commanded by Major John Woodhouse, a founding member of the Malayan Scouts, who returned to Malaya after completing his tenure in Britain as the head SAS training officer.

==== Independent Parachute Regiment Squadron ====
The idea to incorporate personnel from the Parachute Regiment into the Malayan Scouts originated with General Sir Geoffrey Bourne, then commander of Malayan Command. However, the proposal initially sparked tension and hostility between the two units. The clandestine nature of the SAS's operations during WWII meant that their contributions remained largely unknown. As a result, many within the Parachute Regiment were unaware of the SAS's wartime achievements. In an interview conducted in August 2004 with Alastair MacKenzie, John Woodhouse recounted that paratroopers at the time often regarded themselves as superior to the SAS. The absence of parachute qualification wings on the Malayan Scouts' uniforms was perceived as a mark of inferiority, making the prospect of serving under what they viewed as an obscure and unproven unit, like the SAS, difficult to accept. (Note: The SAS and other Special Forces units began to gain widespread attention after Operation Nimrod in 1980. Prior to that, the SAS remained relatively unknown to the public.)

Nevertheless, the Malayan Scouts were grappling with serious manpower shortages, and the need for reinforcements outweighed inter-unit rivalry. The first round of selection was conducted at the Airborne Forces Depot in Aldershot, where paratroopers from all three battalions of the Parachute Regiment underwent evaluation. Most passed the rigorous selection process and were subsequently assigned to the Malayan Scouts as its fifth squadron. This new unit was officially designated the Independent Parachute Regiment Squadron, 22 SAS, under the command of Major Dudley Coventry.

Following their selection, the newly formed squadron was sent to the British Army Jungle Warfare Training School in Malaya. There, they underwent intensive training to shift from conventional airborne infantry tactics to the specialised operational style of the SAS. As the training progressed, mutual respect began to grow between the two units. Nonetheless, a degree of rivalry persisted, particularly between the Independent Parachute Regiment Squadron and C (New Zealand) Squadron.

==== SAS Auxiliary Forces ====
In early 1955, General Sir Gerald Templer, the British High Commissioner in Malaya, requested the formation of a second regiment of Malayan Scouts to bolster the counterinsurgency campaign and alleviate the operational burden on the existing unit. However, the War Office in London rejected the proposal. In response, the British Malayan administration was compelled to consider alternative strategies to meet the increasing demand for personnel in special operations.

One such strategy revived a proposal originally put forward by Colonel Richard O.D. Noone, a British military intelligence officer who was, at the time, serving as Director of the Department of Orang Asli. Noone had long advocated for the creation of a centralised, armed force composed entirely of indigenous Orang Asli tribesmen. Until then, Orang Asli trackers had only been employed on a mission-by-mission basis and had never been formally organised into a permanent unit. (Note: Before the creation of this auxiliary force, British and Commonwealth troops had made operational use of indigenous trackers—such as the Iban, Dayak, and Orang Asli tribesmen—since before the Second World War. However, these contributions were typically ad hoc and lacked formal structure. While the Iban and Dayak had already been formally organised into the Sarawak Rangers, the Orang Asli did not receive a similar framework until the establishment of the Senoi Praaq.) The War Office's refusal to authorise a second Malayan Scouts regiment opened the door for Noone's long-standing plan to be realised.

On 16 March 1955, a dedicated special forces unit composed exclusively of Orang Asli personnel was formally established. Officially named the SAS Auxiliary Forces, the unit would later become better known by its Semai name, Senoi Praaq, meaning "War People". Colonel Noone was appointed as its first commanding officer.

The Senoi Praaq quickly demonstrated exceptional effectiveness in jungle warfare. Their unparalleled tracking abilities, deep familiarity with the terrain, and natural stealth made them an indispensable asset in counterinsurgency operations throughout the Malayan Emergency. Their success was so noteworthy that several members of the unit—including Colonel Noone—were later seconded to the Central Intelligence Agency during the Vietnam War, where they played a key role in training the Montagnard Scouts, a U.S.-backed special forces unit composed of indigenous highland tribesmen in Vietnam.

== Identity and uniform distinctions ==
=== Maroon beret ===
The formal headdress of the Malayan Scouts was the maroon beret, worn with the Special Air Service (SAS) cap badge. They were officially authorised to wear this combination on 22 December 1951, following their formal absorption into the British Army. The maroon beret had been in use by the SAS since World War II, when the regiment began operating in Europe. Prior to that, during their campaigns in North Africa, SAS personnel wore white berets, later replaced by sand-coloured ones. The Malayan Scouts, and later 22 SAS, continued to wear the maroon beret until 1963, when they were deployed to the Middle East and reverted to the sand-coloured beret to reflect the region's desert environment.

=== SAS pattern parachute wings ===
As a regiment within the British SAS structure, the Malayan Scouts wore the SAS-pattern parachute wings on the right shoulder of their uniform. This distinctive insignia signified their airborne qualification and alignment with the broader SAS tradition.

=== Malayan Scouts tactical recognition flash ===
Originally, as a combat unit under Malayan Command, the Malayan Scouts wore the standard green Malayan Command formation insignia on their uniforms. This insignia featured a yellow keris (a traditional Malay dagger) set against a green background. The Malayan Scouts—later redesignated as 22 SAS—adapted this design by changing the background colour to maroon or purplish tones. This modified insignia became their Tactical Recognition Flash, distinguishing them from other units while maintaining a link to their operational origins in Malaya.

== Malayan Scouts (SAS) and the continuity of the SAS and UK Special Forces ==
The Malayan Scouts played a crucial role in ensuring the survival and continuity of the Special Air Service (SAS) and UK Special Forces as a whole. At the end of World War II, the SAS Regiments—1st Special Air Service (1 SAS) and 2nd Special Air Service (2 SAS)—along with their parent brigade, the Special Air Service Troops, were disbanded in 1945. Although the SAS was revived in January 1947 as the 21st Special Air Service Regiment (Artists Rifles) and incorporated into The Rifle Brigade, it was initially set to be converted into a conventional Territorial Army infantry unit.

In July of the same year, 21 SAS was transferred to the Army Air Corps (AAC), possibly intended as a reconnaissance element. However, with the disbandment of the AAC in 1949, 21 SAS was left as an independent unit with no clear purpose. The turning point came during the Malayan Emergency when Major Mike Calvert, a brigadier and the last commanding officer (CO) of the Special Air Service Troops, took the opportunity to revive the SAS and restore its role as a special forces unit. The success of the Malayan Scouts during the conflict solidified its future as a permanent part of the British Army. As a result, the Malayan Scouts were officially renamed the 22nd Special Air Service Regiment (22 SAS) on 22 December 1951.

Despite securing its status as a regular army unit, the SAS once again faced an uncertain future after the Malayan Emergency ended in 1960. British military leadership questioned the necessity of a dedicated special forces unit and considered absorbing 22 SAS into the Parachute Regiment as an airborne infantry battalion. However, John Woodhouse, then the OC of the Malayan Scouts/22 SAS, deployed the regiment to the Middle East during the communist insurgencies of the Dhofar War. This deployment reaffirmed the SAS's value in modern warfare and convinced military leadership that a specialised force like the SAS was essential. From that point forward, the SAS cemented its place as an integral part of the British Army Special Forces—and the rest is history.

== Commanders ==
From its formation in 1950 until the end of the Malayan Emergency in 1960, the Malayan Scouts were led by five commanders:

Commanding Officers of the Malayan Scouts (SAS)/22nd Special Air Service Regiment
Rank	Name	Years of service	Previous unit	Previous WWII unit(s)	Fate
Lieutenant Colonel	Mike Calvert	1950–1951	40th Division	Chindits; Special Air Service Troops	Mike Calvert was dismissed from the British Army in 1952 after being convicted of sexual indecency stemming from an incident in 1951.
Lieutenant Colonel	John Sloane	1951–1953	Argyll and Sutherland Highlanders	Argyll and Sutherland Highlanders	John Bramley Malet Sloane retired with the rank of Major General, marking a distinguished career.
Lieutenant Colonel	Oliver Brooke	1953–1955	Welch Regiment	10th Battalion, Parachute Regiment	Oliver Brooke, a promising officer, suffered a severe back injury in early 1955 after parachuting into trees during an operation with the Malayan Scouts; the injury left him permanently crippled and led to his medical retirement.
Lieutenant Colonel	George Lea	1955–1957	11th Battalion, Parachute Regiment	4th Parachute Brigade	George Lea rose to the rank of lieutenant general, ending his military service as Head of the British Defence Staff in Washington, D.C., before later being appointed Lieutenant of the Tower of London.
Lieutenant Colonel	Tony Deane-Drummond	1957 onwards	Royal Military Academy Sandhurst	3rd Parachute Brigade	Tony Deane-Drummond also retired as a major general, with his final role being the colonel commandant of the Royal Signals.

Technically, Lieutenant Colonel John Sloane was the first official commanding officer of 22 SAS, as the Malayan Scouts were only integrated into the British Army and officially designated as 22 SAS on 22 December 1951—about six months after Mike Calvert was replaced.

== Fate of the Malayan Scouts ==
Although officially redesignated as the 22nd Special Air Service Regiment (22 SAS) on 22 December 1951, the Malayan Scouts continued to be referred to by their original name until their headquarters was relocated from Sungai Besi, to Worcestershire in 1958 and later to Herefordshire in 1960.

Following this relocation, only Headquarters Company and four of the five operational squadrons were formally absorbed into 22 SAS. The fifth unit, known as the Independent Parachute Regiment Squadron, was returned to the Parachute Regiment and reverted to the role of a conventional airborne formation. Meanwhile, the SAS Auxiliary Forces, the Senoi Praaq, remained in Malaya. They were placed under the Malayan government's department responsible for indigenous affairs and, in 1968, were formally integrated into the infantry branch of the Malaysian federal police.

There are no records detailing the fate of the Quartermaster Section, but the Intelligence Section was reintegrated into the Malayan police force. It played a key role in the development of the Special Branch, which later evolved into a domestic intelligence agency similar to MI5 and the FBI.

== Legacy ==
=== Formation of successor special forces units ===
The Malayan Scouts left a profound legacy that reshaped global perceptions of modern special forces. One of their most direct contributions was the establishment of Special Air Service (SAS) regiments in Australia, New Zealand, and Rhodesia. These nations, whose military personnel initially served as squadrons within the Malayan Scouts, later formed their own elite units: the Australian Special Air Service Regiment, the New Zealand Special Air Service, and the Rhodesian Special Air Service—each bearing the SAS name and ethos.

The influence of the Malayan Scouts extended well beyond the Commonwealth. They played a pivotal, albeit indirect, role in inspiring the creation of other elite formations, such as the U.S. Army's Delta Force, the French Army Light Aviation, and Malaysia's Gerak Khas. Charles Beckwith, the founder of Delta Force, served with the Malayan Scouts/22 SAS as an exchange officer during the Malayan Emergency. His experiences convinced him of the need for a comparable American unit, which led to the establishment of Delta Force in 1977.

Similarly, in 1952, French Army Captain Déodat du Puy-Montbrun served for one year as an exchange officer with the Malayan Scouts/22 SAS. Drawing on his experiences in Malaya, he proposed the integration of helicopters into French commando operations—mirroring the tactics employed by the Scouts. His proposal was accepted, resulting in the creation of the Helicopter Commando Unit in 1954, where he was appointed second-in-command. This unit later evolved into the French Army Light Aviation and became a pioneer in French air assault tactics that would eventually serve as a model for U.S. helicopter operations during the Vietnam War.

In Southeast Asia, the Malaysian Special Service Unit—now known as Gerak Khas—was founded in 1965. Initially selected and trained by 40 Commando Royal Marines, the unit's development was further shaped through training provided by veterans of the Malayan Scouts/22 SAS at the British Army Jungle Warfare Training School. Both Delta Force and Gerak Khas adopted operational frameworks and training doctrines rooted in the experience and innovations of the Malayan Scouts, underscoring their foundational role in shaping modern special operations forces worldwide.

=== Influence on special operations doctrine ===
The modern British SAS and the broader United Kingdom Special Forces (UKSF) owe much of their current structure and doctrine to John Woodhouse, an intelligence officer who was recruited into the Malayan Scouts. Woodhouse played a key role in reshaping how special forces operated, persuading British Army leadership that intelligence capabilities were as critical as combat skills.

Drawing from his operational experience in Malaya, Woodhouse restructured the SAS selection and training processes—many elements of which remain in use today. Among his most lasting contributions was the permanent integration of jungle warfare into the selection process, now known as the "Jungle Phase" of UKSF Selection. Chris Ryan, in The History of the SAS: As Told by the Men on the Ground, credits Woodhouse as the architect of the modern SAS.

=== Pioneering innovations in warfare tactics and equipment ===
Beyond training and doctrine, the Malayan Scouts also transformed military tactics and equipment, particularly in jungle warfare, tree-jumping insertions, helicopter operations, and combat uniforms. Their experiences in Malaya directly influenced the development of the Tropical Combat Uniform (commonly known as jungle fatigues), which was later adopted by the U.S. military in 1964.

==== The birth of helicopter warfare ====
The first documented use of helicopters in military operations occurred on 25 April 1944, when a YR-4B helicopter from the U.S. Army Air Forces' 1st Air Commando Group was deployed to rescue three Chindit commandos during the Burma Campaign in World War II. Although the mission was successful, it was considered an extraordinary feat due to the primitive state of helicopter technology at the time. The YR-4B, a two-seater and the first mass-produced helicopter, was designed primarily for evaluation and testing. It was not intended for combat and could only carry one pilot and one passenger. As such, this mission is viewed as an isolated event rather than a standard military operation.

In contrast, the Malayan Emergency marked the first sustained and effective use of helicopters as a strategic asset in military operations. According to Greek military historian and journalist Stavros Atlamazoglou in 2021, the Malayan Scouts were the first combat unit to permanently incorporate helicopters into active operations, beginning on 29 October 1952.

Although historians such as Charles R. Shrader (The First Helicopter War: Logistics and Mobility in Algeria, 1954–1962, 1999) and Walter J. Boyne (How the Helicopter Changed Modern Warfare, 2011) have credited the French Army with pioneering helicopter warfare during the Algerian War, Atlamazoglou argues that it was actually the British who first operationalised these tactics during the Malayan Emergency. This perspective is supported by Dr Stephen Rookes of the Centre de recherche de l'École de l'air in France. In his 2025 study, The Evolution of Heliborne Operations in the Cold War Conflicts of Algeria, Angola and Rhodesia, 1954–1979, Rookes notes that in 1952, the French military sent observers—including Captain Déodat du Puy-Montbrun—to Malaya specifically to study the helicopter warfare techniques employed by the Malayan Scouts. Similar assessments appear in RAF Helicopters: The First Twenty Years (1992) by John Dowling and Accomplishments of Airpower in the Malayan Emergency, 1948–1960 (2015) by Arthur D. Barontes, both of which support Atlamazoglou's conclusions.

The Malayan Emergency also saw one of the earliest uses of helicopters in a combat support role. In 1953, a Westland Dragonfly was modified to carry chemical agents for use in herbicidal warfare. The first operation took place on 31 August 1953 in the Kluang and Labis regions of Johor, where toxic agents were sprayed to destroy communist agricultural plots hidden in the jungle. Due to the effectiveness of these missions, the British increased the number of deployed helicopters, with eighteen Dragonflies in service by the end of 1953, forming the core of No. 194 Squadron RAF.

However, the French are still widely credited with developing the first true attack helicopters. During the Algerian War in 1956, two French officers—Colonel Félix Brunet of Escadre d'Hélicoptères 2 (EH2) and Colonel Alexis Santini of the French Army Helicopter Training Division—independently modified helicopters to permanently mount firearms, paving the way for dedicated helicopter gunships.

The growing demand for air mobility led to the deployment of larger aircraft such as the British-built Westland Whirlwind, a British adaptation of the Sikorsky S-55. Of the ten Westland Whirlwind helicopters assigned to 848 Naval Air Squadron, several were permanently allocated to the Malayan Scouts. These aircraft played critical roles in resupply, troop insertion, close air support, and medical evacuation.

Operating under extreme conditions in the dense jungles of Malaya and under constant threat from communist insurgents, British helicopter pilots developed and refined air mobility tactics that were still considered experimental elsewhere. While the U.S. Marine Corps had conceptualised helicopter assault strategies as early as 1947 during the Korean War, these ideas were not fully implemented until the early 1960s—years after British forces had already demonstrated their effectiveness in the Malayan theatre. (Note: There are many opinions regarding the development of military helicopter operations. However, most sources agree that the U.S. military only perfected such operations in the early 1960s during the Vietnam War, whereas the pilots supporting the Malayan Scouts had already refined several key aspects of helicopter use years earlier.)

=== Preservation of legacy within the modern SAS ===
Today, the legacy of the Malayan Scouts lives on within the British SAS, particularly in D Squadron of 22 SAS. The squadron's badge features a keris, a traditional Malay weapon, symbolising its historical roots in the Malayan Emergency. This design is inspired by the formation insignia of the former British Malayan Command, which depicted a yellow keris on a green background. Malayan Scouts/22 SAS adapted the design, changing the background colour to maroon or purplish tones, and continues to use it as a symbol of its heritage and enduring connection to the Malayan Scouts.

== Notable members ==
- Anthony Greville-Bell – Anthony Greville-Bell, DSO, was an Australian-born British Army engineer, SAS officer, scriptwriter, and sculptor. Commissioned into the Royal Engineers in WWII, he later served in the 2nd SAS under Bill Stirling. In 1950, he joined the Malayan Scouts and became the first OC of B Squadron in 1951. His screenwriting credits include Perfect Friday, The Strange Vengeance of Rosalie, and Theatre of Blood. He died on 4 March 2008 at 87 and was portrayed by Stuart Thompson in the BBC series SAS: Rogue Heroes.
- Déodat of Puy-Montbrun – Déodat du Puy-Montbrun, LoH, GC, was a decorated French special forces commando, resistance fighter, and pioneer of military helicopter use. An WWII SOE operative trained by the SAS, he served behind enemy lines and later helped found key French special units, including the 11th Shock Parachute Regiment, the Mixed Airborne Commando Group, and the Helicopter Commando Unit, which later evolved into the French Army Light Aviation. In 1952, he joined the Malayan Scouts as an exchange officer, which inspired his advocacy for helicopter use in special operations. He later served as a helicopter pilot in the Algerian War and, post-military, became a journalist and novelist. In 2009, EMIA honoured him with a badge and chant in his name.
- Frank Rennie – Frank Rennie, CBE MC, was a highly respected New Zealand Army officer and the founding father of the New Zealand SAS. After serving in the Pacific and Italian theatres under ANZAC during WWII, he was given authority by the Malayan Scouts in 1955 to conduct SAS selection in New Zealand. He became the first OC of C (New Zealand) Squadron, 22 SAS, later that year. For his role in the Malayan Emergency, he was awarded the Military Cross in 1958. Rennie died on 17 November 1992 at the age of 74.
- George Lea – Sir George Harris Lea, KCB DSO MBE, was a senior British Army officer and the fourth commanding officer of the Malayan Scouts (1955–1957). Commissioned before WWII, he commanded the 11th Battalion, Parachute Regiment, and was captured during Operation Market Garden. After retiring in 1970, he served as Lieutenant of the Tower of London. He died on 27 December 1990, aged 77.
- John Slim – John Douglas Slim, 2nd Viscount Slim, OBE DL FRGS, was a British nobleman, military officer, and veteran of WWII, the Korean War, and the Malayan Emergency. Commissioned in 1944, he served with the 6th Gurkha Rifles in Burma, later joining the Argyll and Sutherland Highlanders. He volunteered for the Malayan Scouts (SAS) in 1952, served for a decade, and became commander of 22 SAS in 1967. In 1970, he was appointed chief of staff (Special Forces) for UK Land Forces, a role equivalent to the modern-day Director of Special Forces. He died on 12 January 2019, aged 91.
- John Woodhouse – John Michael Woodhouse, MBE MC, was a key figure in shaping the modern SAS. A WWII veteran and former POW, he joined the Malayan Scouts in 1950 and later revolutionised SAS training and selection. He served in senior roles with 21 and 22 SAS, becoming CO of 22 SAS in 1962. The Times recognised him as the second most influential figure in SAS history after David Stirling. He died on 15 February 2008, aged 85.
- Mike Calvert – James Michael Calvert, DSO & Bar, was a British Army and British Indian Army officer crucial to preserving the SAS during its near-disbandment. Commissioned into the Royal Engineers in 1933, he trained as a commando in 1939, fought in Norway, and helped form early commando units in Hong Kong and Australia. In the Burma campaign, he ran a jungle warfare school before joining the Chindits, where he was wounded and sent back to the UK. Promoted to brigadier in 1945, he became the final commander of the SAS before its wartime dissolution. Demoted to major postwar, he was posted to Hong Kong in 1949 and later invited by General Sir John Harding to assist in Malaya, where he founded the Malayan Scouts. In 1952, he was dismissed from the army after a controversial conviction for sexual misconduct, which he denied until his death. He moved to Australia, returned to England, and became a research fellow at the University of Manchester in 1971, sharing his expertise in irregular warfare. His later years were troubled by alcoholism and personal issues, and he died on 26 November 1998 at the age of 85.
- Peter Walls – George Peter Walls, GLM DCD MBE, was a Rhodesian military officer and the former commander of the Rhodesian Armed Forces during the Bush War. Commissioned into the Black Watch in 1946 after training at Sandhurst, he later joined the Northern Rhodesia Regiment. In 1951, he passed Malayan Scouts selection and became OC of C (Rhodesia) Squadron, 22 SAS. Exiled to South Africa after Zimbabwe's independence, he died on 10 July 2010 at age 83.
- Ronald Reid-Daly – Ronald Francis Reid-Daly, CLM DMM MBE, was the founder of the Selous Scouts and a pioneer of bush warfare during the Rhodesian Bush War. Selected for the Malayan Scouts in 1951 despite no prior military experience, he served in Malaya for three years. Returning to Rhodesia, he became an instructor at School of Infantry and the first Regimental Sergeant Major of the Rhodesian Light Infantry before commissioning in 1964. In 1975, he proposed and led the Selous Scouts until 1979, earning acclaim as a top unconventional warfare leader.
- Tony Deane-Drummond – Anthony John Deane-Drummond, CB DSO MC & Bar, was a British Army signals officer and airborne pioneer. He volunteered for No. 2 Commando, which became the 11th SAS Battalion, and took part in the first British WWII airborne operation, Operation Colossus. He later became an instructor and, in 1957, the final commander of the Malayan Scouts. Deane-Drummond is credited with keeping the SAS independent from the Parachute Regiment and led 22 SAS in the Jebel Akhdar War, solidifying its special forces role. His career was featured on BBC's This Is Your Life in 1960.
