= Mike Calvert =

British soldier (1913–1998)

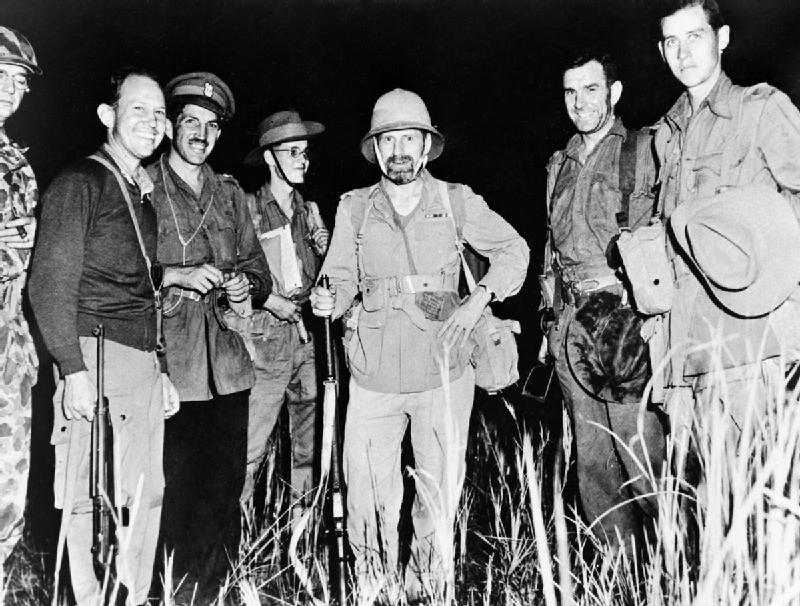
- Brigadier Mike Calvert, third from left, with Orde Wingate (centre) and other Chindits at the "Broadway" airfield in Burma awaiting a night supply drop, 1944.
- Born: James Michael Calvert; 6 March 1913; Rohtak, India
- Died: 26 November 1998 (aged 85); Richmond-upon-Thames, England
- Military career
- Allegiance: United Kingdom
- Branch: British Army
- Service years: 1931–1952
- Rank: Brigadier
- Nickname: "Mad Mike"
- Service number: 58046
- Units: Royal Engineers; Long Range Penetration Groups
- Commands: Malayan Scouts (1950–1951); Special Air Service Brigade (1944–1945); 77th Indian Infantry Brigade (1944)
- Conflicts: Second World War: Burma campaign; North-West Europe; Malayan Emergency
- Awards: Distinguished Service Order & Bar; Silver Star (United States); King Haakon VII's Cross of Liberty (Norway); Commander of the Order of Leopold II with Palm (Belgium); Croix de Guerre with Palm (Belgium)
- Other work: Writer, lecturer

Brigadier James Michael Calvert, DSO & Bar (6 March 1913 – 26 November 1998) was a British Army officer who was involved in special operations in Burma during the Second World War. He participated in both Chindit operations and was instrumental in popularizing the unorthodox ideas of Orde Wingate. He frequently led attacks from the front, a practice that earned him the nickname amongst the men under his command of "Mad Mike."

Calvert's post-war service is often described in unflattering terms, but in many ways he can be seen as having a profound and lasting impact on the post-war development of the SAS.

== Early life ==
Calvert was born at Rohtak in India, son of a member of the Indian Civil Service. He was educated at Bradfield College and the Royal Military Academy, Woolwich, from which he was commissioned as a subaltern into the British Army's Royal Engineers as a professional soldier in February 1933. For a time he was the Army's middleweight boxing champion. He spent a year reading for the Mechanical Engineering Tripos at St. John's College, Cambridge. In 1934 he returned to active service and was posted to the Hong Kong Royal Engineers, where he learned to speak Cantonese. He also witnessed the Imperial Japanese Army's attack on Shanghai and the rape of Nanking, which made him one of the few officers in the British Army before the Second World War who fully appreciated the nature of the threat posed by Japanese imperialism.

== Second World War ==
When the Second World War broke out in 1939, Calvert briefly commanded a detachment of Royal Engineers in the Norwegian campaign, then trained commando detachments in demolition techniques in Hong Kong and Australia. In Australia, along with F. Spencer Chapman, he assisted with training Australian commandos who formed the first Australian Army Independent Companies at Wilsons Promontory, Victoria in 1941. He was then appointed to command the Bush Warfare School in Burma, training officers and non-commissioned officers to lead guerilla bands in China for operations against the Japanese.

The Japanese invaded Burma in early 1942. Calvert and others from the school raided Henzada by riverboat after the fall of Rangoon as a deception operation to convince the Japanese that Australian reinforcements had reached Burma. Calvert then spent a period of time touring Burma with Orde Wingate. After the Bush Warfare School closed, Calvert was sent with 22 men from the school and a few hundred men separated from their units to guard the Gokteik Viaduct thirty miles east of Maymyo. (The Allied Commander in Chief, General Archibald Wavell apparently hoped that Calvert would use his initiative and demolish it, in spite of orders from the civil government to keep it intact. For once, Calvert obeyed orders.)

After retreating from the viaduct, Calvert participated in a deception operation involving the loss of a set of false papers to the Japanese. Calvert's unit finally retreated to India at the very rear of the army, often behind the Japanese lines.

=== Operation Longcloth ===
In India, Calvert reunited with the equally unorthodox Wingate, and the two became firm friends. Calvert led one of the company-sized columns in Operation Longcloth, Wingate's first Chindit operation in 1943. This was a long-range penetration operation behind enemy lines, which put great demands on the endurance of all who took part. Calvert was awarded the Distinguished Service Order (DSO) for his achievements on the operation. His column achieved the greatest amount of demolition of the Japanese lines of communication, and reached India intact with the fewest casualties of those in the force.

=== Operation Thursday ===
==== The Fly-In ====
Calvert commanded the 77th Indian Infantry Brigade in Operation Thursday, the much larger second Chindit operation. His brigade spearheaded the airborne landings deep in the Japanese rear. The operation was staged from Lalaghat, with D-Day fixed for 5 March. That morning, one of General Philip Cochran's B-25 Mitchells flew over and photographed the landing zones. Wingate had ordered that no aircraft should fly over the landing zones, lest the operation be betrayed, but Cochran was not directly under Wingate's command and felt that launching the operation without accurate intelligence was a dangerous gamble. The photographs clearly showed that one of landing sites selected, codenamed Piccadilly, was unusable.

It was at this dramatic moment, with everyone keyed up and ready to go, that the aerial photographs arrived. They showed that primary landing site Broadway was clear, but Piccadilly had been blocked by tree trunks; no gliders would land there that night. The general opinion was that the Japs had realized the possibilities of Piccadilly as a landing area and had deliberately blocked it, though some time later we discovered that the explanation was much simpler: Burmese woodmen had laid out their trees to dry in the clearing.

Wingate was enraged by Cochran's actions but admitted that the danger was real. He and Calvert weighed the options. The danger of executing a potentially compromised operation were substantial, but any delay threatened to push back the window of opportunity by at least a month. Of the three planned sites only two were available; Calvert suggested the plan be further altered and the entire brigade flown into Broadway. He said, "I am prepared to take the whole of my brigade into Broadway and do without [second landing site] Piccadilly." Calvert later wrote, "We had taken into account that [third landing site] Chowringhee was to the east of the Irrawaddy while Broadway was west of the river. I told Wingate, 'I don't want to split my brigade either side of the Irrawaddy. I am prepared to take all the brigade into Broadway alone and take the consequence of a slower build-up.'" Lieutenant-General William Slim "asked Calvert...and found him strongly against [using] Chowringhee." Further discussion with Slim and Wingate clinched the matter: "it was to be Broadway alone. I was nervous as bales, I imagine we all were, but we all knew we had to go...In any case Broadway was clear and I could really see no reason why we should not go in there just because Piccadilly was blocked."

Each American C-47 towed two heavily laden Waco CG-4 gliders. Although a double tow posed no problems for a competent pilot in good weather, many of the pilots were inexperienced and the route across the mountain ranges bordering the Chindwin river guaranteed a turbulent, unsettled flight. The first gliders were scheduled to arrive at Broadway by 9:30pm, but by 2:00am Wingate and the others waiting at Lalaghat had not yet heard from Calvert. Poor reconnaissance, not enemy resistance, caused the delay, as aerial reconnaissance had failed to show a number of ditches scarring the field at Broadway. Calvert wrote:

All six of the advance party gliders had landed and the plan had been that we would wheel them off to make way for the next batch, which would in turn be wheeled away and so on. But we had reckoned without the ditches. Three of the six gliders were so badly wrecked that the small force at present on the ground could not shift them. We worked at them furiously but suddenly I heard a shout and looked up. In the bright light of the moon I saw to my horror that the first two of the next batch had cast off [their tows] and were winging their silent way down.

Calvert transmitted the prearranged signal "Soya Link", the most despised of ration items, to stop all flying, but at 6:30am on 6 March he radioed the code words "Pork Sausage" to resume flights into Broadway. A strip for C-47s was in place that evening, and supplies came rushing in. Calvert lost no time in organizing reconnaissance missions and fortifying Broadway. By 13 March the build-up was complete. In seven nights about 9,000 men, 1,350 animals, 250 tons of supplies and weapons had landed behind enemy lines in Burma.

==== Broadway ====
On 17 March Calvert led a bayonet charge against Japanese positions shielded by a sunken road and a steep hill crowned with a pagoda. He noticed that friendly forces nearby were drawing heavier fire. In fact, elements of the South Staffordshire Regiment had dug in adjacent to a Japanese unit. Neither force was aware of the other. Deciding that something had to be done, he elected to make a frontal assault:

I saw something had to be done pretty quickly, so I shouted to Freddie that we were going to charge. I then told everyone that we were going to charge the Pagoda Hill. There were reinforcements on our left flank who would charge as well. So, standing up, I shouted out 'Charge' in the approved Victorian manner, and ran down the hill...Half of the South Staffords joined in. Then looking back I found a lot had not. So I told them to bloody well 'Charge, what the hell do you think you're doing.' So they charged. Machine-gunners, mortar teams, all officers – everybody who was on that hill

The fighting quickly degenerated into a free-for-all. Calvert characterized the action as an "extraordinary mêlée...everyone shooting, bayoneting, kicking at everyone else, rather like an officers' guest night." Lieutenant George Cairns was awarded the Victoria Cross for killing several Japanese after one severed his left arm with a sword. A pause in the fighting turned into a stalemate, complete with shouting, according to Calvert: "The Japs were yelling at us in English, 'You dirty hairy bastards'". Only a final charge made by Calvert and some Gurkhas dislodged the Japanese. Many of these were shot as they retreated. Afterward, "the hill was a horrid sight, littered with Jap dead, and already the ones who had been killed there earlier in the day were black with flies. Stretcher-bearers were removing our wounded and our mercifully very few dead".

Shortly after this action a lieutenant in the South Staffordshire Regiment, Norman Durant, wrote a compelling description of Calvert in a letter to his parents:

His hair flops over his forehead, and he has a disconcerting habit of staring at you when you speak to him and yet not appearing to hear a word. His lectures were always painfully slow and hesitant and during training he gave the impression of taking a long time to make up his mind; in action things were very different. He knows all the officers in the brigade and many of the senior NCOs, and his manner and attitude are always the same if he is talking to a CO, a subaltern or a private...

Calvert's dedication to the troops under his command was one of his most visible attributes. According to David Rooney he was "one of the most successful of the Chindit leaders [and] showed his greatness as a commander by reminding his men that, however bad things were for them, things were probably much worse for the enemy."

==== White City ====
The brigade then captured and held a position near Mawlu. Calvert "saw that Mawlu [the location of the block] was the crucial point for road and rail traffic and determined to build up a defensive box there." Because of the supply drop parachutes adorning the surrounding jungle, it became known as the White City. This fortified position blocked Japanese road and rail communications to their northern front for over two months. A large rectangle, 1,000 by 800 yards, White City was quickly identified by the Japanese as a threat. Probing attacks on 18, 19, and 20 March inflicted a handful of casualties, but were beaten back without significant loss. The Japanese mounted a serious attack on the night of 21 March that resulted in "very confused close-quarter fighting" that lasted all night. Two Japanese light machine guns were established in the block; a dawn attack led by flamethrower-equipped infantry displaced the Japanese, driving them outside the perimeter. Calvert was instrumental in orchestrating the counterattacks and was frequently under fire.

After repulsing numerous nighttime attacks, Calvert had two relatively quiet weeks to fortify White City. Under his direction a thick hedge of barbed wire was put in place and surrounded with mines and booby traps. Firing positions were dug in and camouflaged; reinforced with logs and earth, these positions were invisible and all-but impenetrable. Calvert also established a defensive fire plan to coordinate machine gun and mortar fire. Some 2-pounder anti-tank guns arrived on 29 March and were quickly put in place. These were followed by engineers who built a landing strip capable of handling C-47 cargo aircraft, which delivered more artillery. White City was eventually defended by four anti-tank guns, six Bofors 40 mm autocannons and four 25-pounders. Calvert had a not insubstantial arsenal at his disposal.

On 6 April the White City again came under attack. The Japanese shelled and bombed the block throughout the afternoon. Calvert recalled that the terrain combined with meticulous attention to detail in constructing the positions provided shelter, and that casualties were low. The only effective weapon the Japanese possessed was a 6-inch mortar, an old coastal defence piece they had laboriously dragged through the jungle to bombard the block. The mortar fired a bomb four and a half feet long that was in flight for more than 30 seconds. Calvert described the mortar as "the bane of our existence." Calvert spent the attack in a dugout, coordinating his troops' response via telephone. He reported that stiff resistance led by his friend Ian MacPherson prevented the Japanese from breaching the block.

From 6 April through 11 April, Calvert wrote, "the sequence of attack was the same practically every night and only varied in intensity." Japanese infantry attacked after dark, invariably running into stiff resistance from emplaced machine guns, mines, barbed wire, booby traps, artillery, and sustained rifle fire. The Japanese brought forward two light tanks; these were quickly destroyed with 2-pounder anti-tank guns. Confident in the block's ability to withstand any attack, Calvert's only concern was his rapidly dwindling supply of ammunition. Machine gun ammunition was being used at a frantic pace. In all, some 700,000 rounds of Vickers machine gun ammunition were dropped into White City. Calvert requested that supply drops contain less food and more ammunition.

Calvert led several counter-attacks against encircling Japanese forces in person. On 13 April he commanded a much larger attack involving most of the brigade. Despite the intervention of American P-51 Mustangs, the attack was a failure; Calvert was forced to order a retreat. He learned that Major Ian MacPherson, commander of the headquarters company of the 77th Brigade had been killed, his body left in the Japanese positions. Calvert said he "could not leave anyone like that without knowing for certain" before starting back to look for MacPherson. Only when the brigade major "heaved out his revolver, stuck it in my stomach and said, 'I'll shoot you if you don't go back. I was with him when he was killed'" did Calvert resume the retreat.

==== Mogaung ====
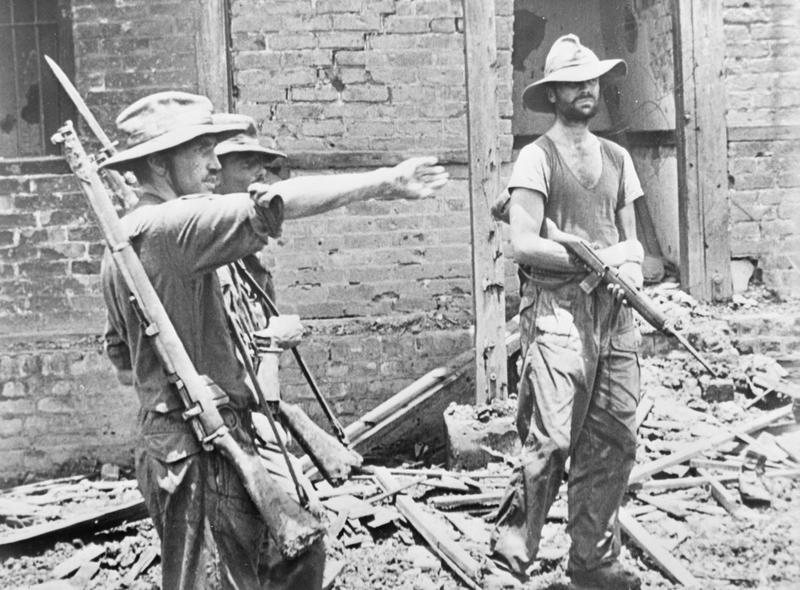
Calvert (left) giving orders during the capture of Mogaung in June 1944.

In May, the Chindit brigades moved north. The monsoon had broken and floods impeded the Chindits' operations. On 27 May, Major-General Walter Lentaigne (who had taken command of the Chindits after Wingate was killed in an air crash in late March) ordered Calvert's brigade to capture the town of Mogaung. Calvert at first promised to capture Mogaung by 5 June. However, the Japanese reinforced the defenders of the town until it was held by a force of four battalions from the 53rd Division. As Calvert's brigade tried to advance over flooded flat ground, they suffered severely from shortage of rations, exhaustion and disease. Finally, Calvert was reinforced by a Chinese battalion and put in an all-out assault on 24 June which captured almost all of the town. The last resistance was cleared by 27 June. Calvert's brigade had suffered 800 battle casualties in the siege, half of its strength. Of the remainder, only 300 men were left fit to fight.

The American General Joseph Stilwell, who had overall command of the Chindits, announced via the BBC that the Chinese troops of his Northern Combat Area Command had captured Mogaung. Calvert signalled to Stilwell's headquarters "Chinese reported taking Mogaung. My Brigade now taking umbrage."

When he received orders to move to Myitkyina, where another Japanese garrison was holding out, Calvert closed down his brigade's radio sets and marched to Stilwell's headquarters in Kamaing instead. A court martial was threatened, but after he and Stilwell finally met in person and Stilwell appreciated for the first time the conditions under which the Chindits had operated, the 77th Brigade was evacuated to India to recover. Calvert was awarded a Bar to the DSO for the second Chindit expedition. In the field Calvert was "clearly the most successful and aggressive Chindit commander," and a font of "positive leadership" throughout the campaign.

=== SAS Operations ===
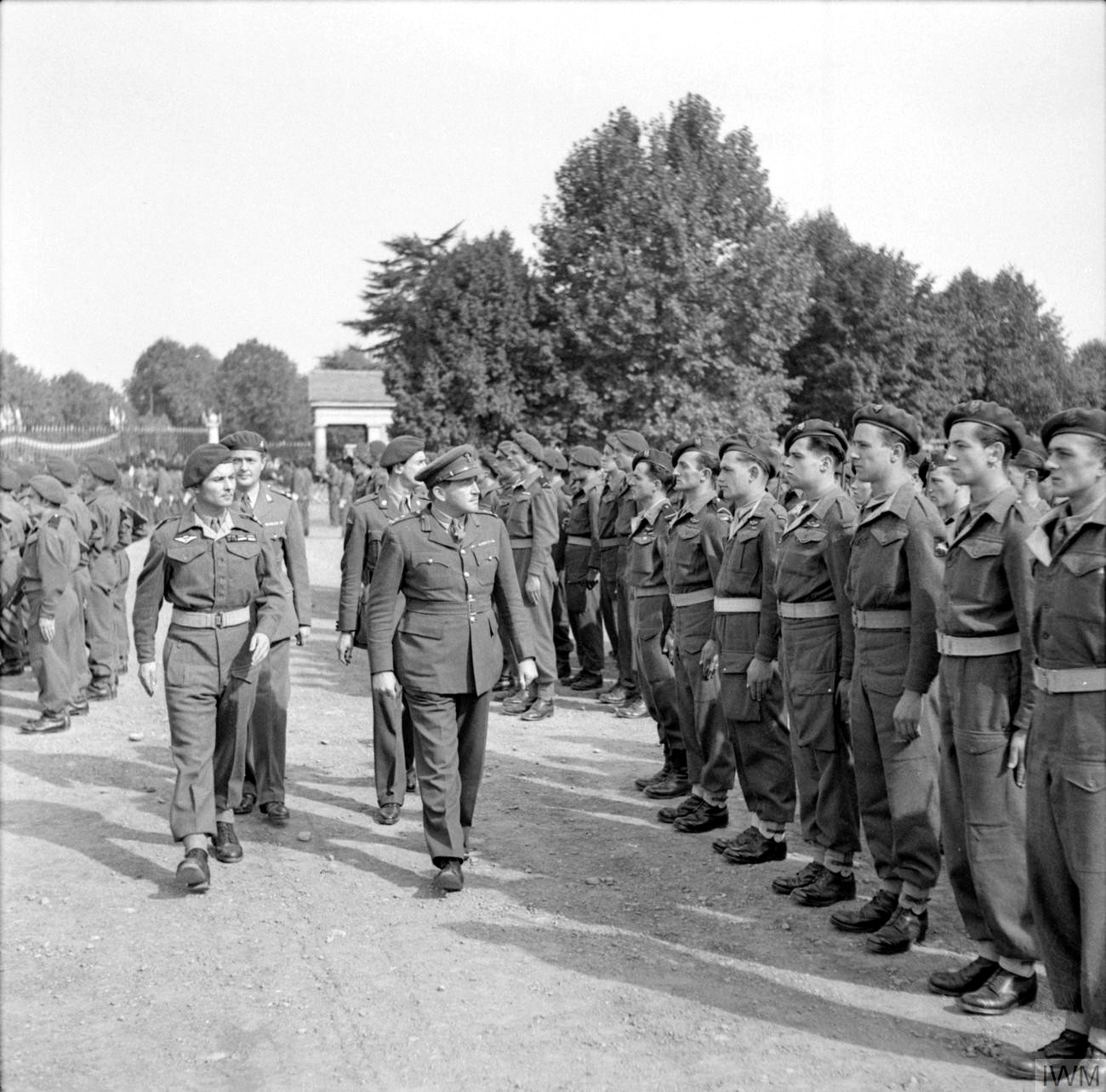
Calvert at the ceremony marking the passing of 3 and 4 SAS to France in October 1945.

Calvert was evacuated to Britain on medical grounds (ironically following an accidental injury) in September 1944. To his dismay, the Chindits were disbanded while he was still in hospital.

By March 1945 he was in command of the Special Air Service Troops, a brigade formed by bringing together British, French and Belgian SAS units in 1944 to serve in the Second Front in Europe. There was some controversy when the brigade was formed, Bill Stirling objecting to the proposed role of the SAS and resigning from the regiment. There were also mixed views on Calvert's appointment, as, unlike many other decorated SAS officers at the time, he had no prior SAS, desert or European experience. Calvert knew the Stirling brothers from his time instructing Commandos in 1940.

On taking over at a relatively quiet period for the SAS at the end of the war, Calvert said he found 1 and 2 SAS "living rather a country house existence" in Essex, "going off to the races" - they "thought they had fought their war". Calvert's orders were to "get them all together and get them into action within 3 weeks". According to Calvert, 1 SAS under Paddy Mayne and 2 SAS under Brian Franks initially resisted, putting up lots of objections. Brian Franks used his connections to complain to General Dempsey about the role; Calvert "had to give him a hell of a rocket to get him going".

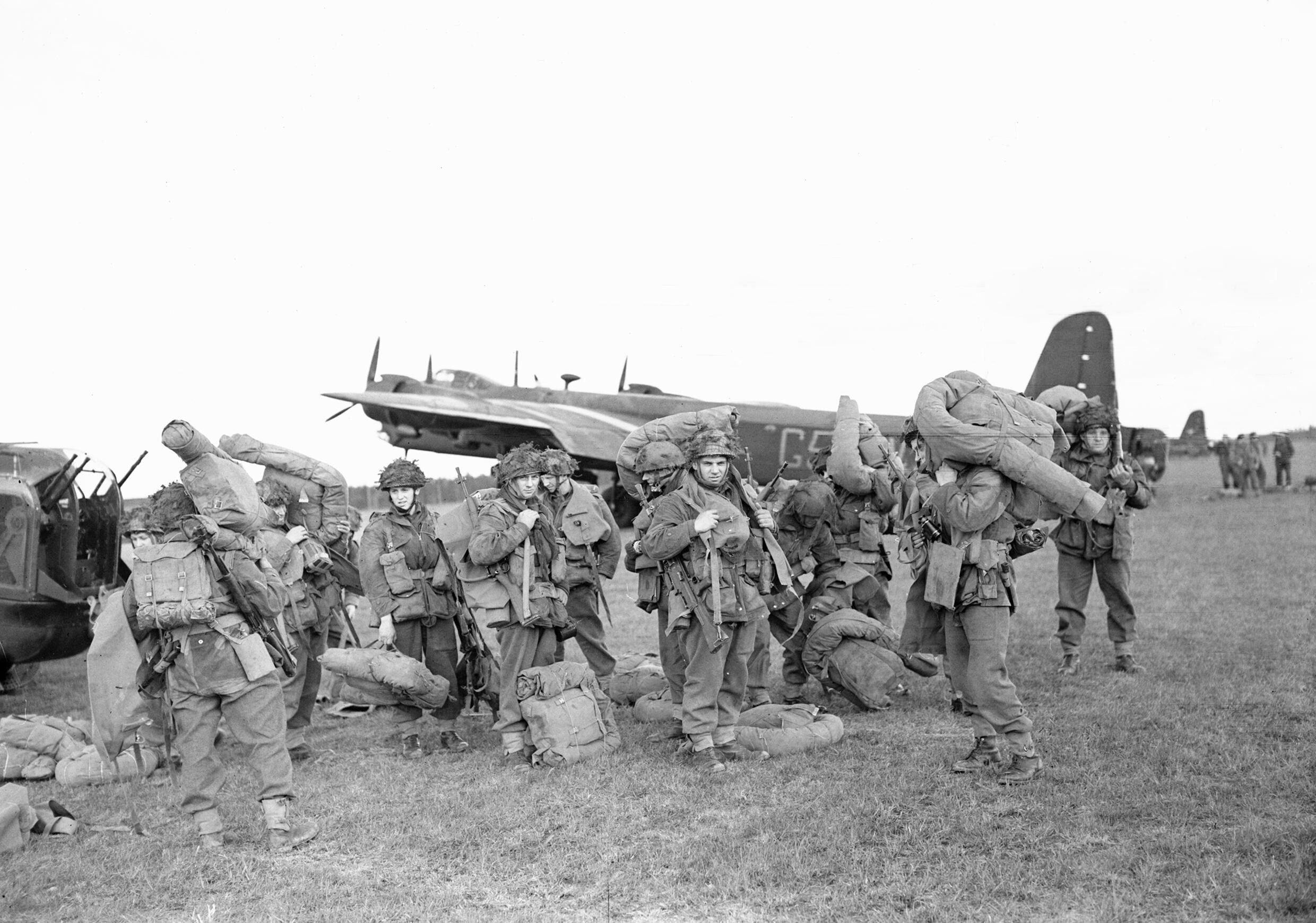
British airborne troops disembark from Short Stirling aircraft at Gardermoen airfield near Oslo as part of Operation Doomsday, May 1945

Calvert oversaw Operation Howard (1SAS under Paddy Mayne in N W Germany) and Operation Amherst (British and French forces in N E Holland), before commanding 1 and 2 SAS in Operation Apostle (part of Operation Doomsday) in May 1945 in Norway. The mission was to help maintain order during the fragile early stages of peace, disarm remaining German forces, secure coastal installations, and oversee the repatriation of German and Soviet prisoners of war. Tensions soon developed with the Soviet repatriation commission, particularly when some prisoners resisted forced return to the USSR. In early July, relations between the SAS and Norwegian authorities became strained after SAS soldiers freed a comrade who had been arrested by local police—an incident later referred to as the "Battle of Bergen." When Calvert broke his leg and had to return to the UK, he was succeeded by Brigadier Guy Prendergast. Despite the challenges, the SAS brigade successfully completed its objectives and withdrew from Norway in late August 1945.

The Second World War concluded with the disbandment of SAS forces. French and Belgian SAS units returned to their national armies. Calvert was awarded a French and a Belgian Croix de Guerre for his leadership. Calvert presided at the formal disbandment of 1 and 2 SAS on 8 October 1945.

In late 1945 a War Office enquiry was set up (some say at Calvert's instigation) to investigate the achievements of the SAS during the war and its possible role in the future. Calvert took the lead and sent briefing notes to David and Bill Stirling, Brian Franks, Paddy Mayne and other leading Special Forces figures with suggestions as to how they might respond. The enquiry concluded that the SAS should have a role distinct from normal infantry; it should be a highly specialised force, manned by individuals who might not always fit into a normal infantry unit. The recommendation to re-form a regular unit was rejected but the formation of a territorial unit was approved: 21SAS (Artists) was established in 1947 under Brian Franks, the former CO of 2 SAS. Franks, who served as CO of 21SAS until 1950, subsequently took the lead in promoting the SAS's interests when Calvert moved on to other things, although Calvert 'kept his finger on the pulse" through his role within the Regimental Association.

== Post-war service ==
In the years after WW2, Mike Calvert was a well-known, easily recognisable military figure, famous for his actions behind enemy lines with the Chindits fighting the Japanese, and with a reputation for being a creative military planner and thinker. He could also be a controversial figure, in part because he was open, but also because of his association with the Chindits and Wingate, seen by some in the Army as divisive influences. He was a rebel, particularly when it involved criticising staff officers.

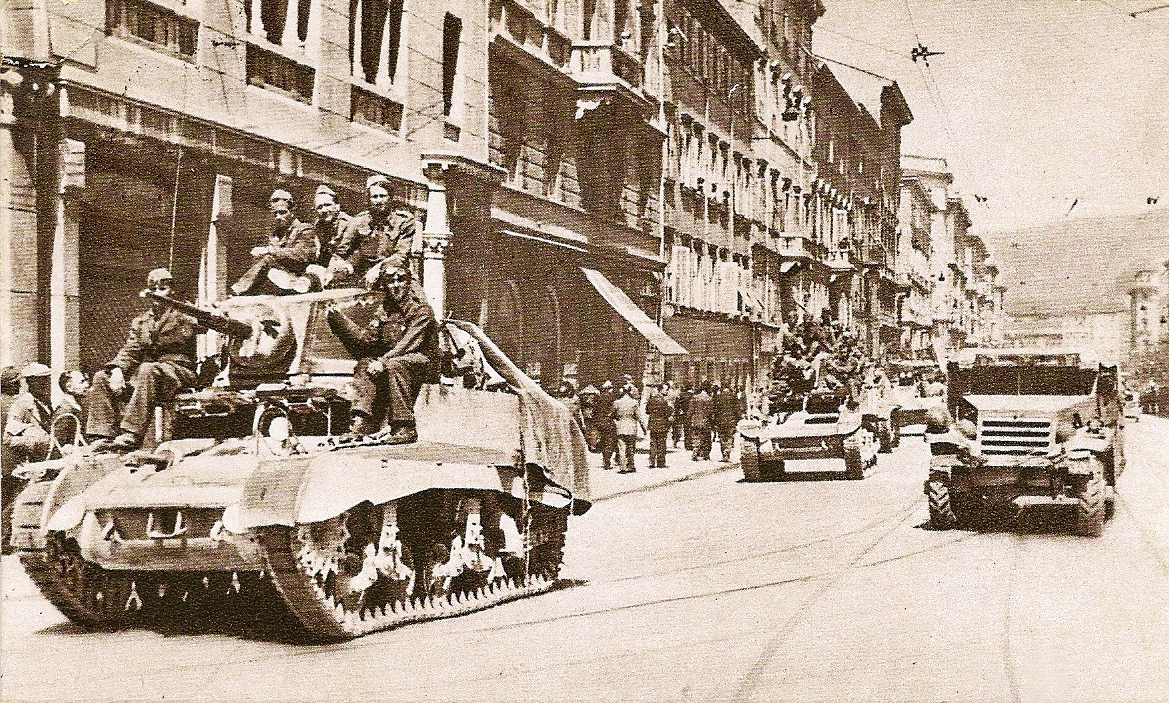
Tito's communist troops entering Trieste, 1945

After a spell with the Royal Engineers in India (where Calvert chose to use the Sappers' and Miners' mess instead of the Senior Officers' mess), in August 1947 he attended the Army's Staff College, Camberley, where, he said, "I learned a lot, though I couldn't help arguing now and then". After passing the course, he was invited to join Field Marshal Montgomery's planning staff, where one of his tasks was to plan the logistics of a proposed landing on the coast of Malaya, followed by an advance up to Siam. In 1948 he was appointed to a staff post as lieutenant-colonel in the Allied Military Government in Trieste, one of the first places to see real clashes between communism and the west. In response to rising tension with China, he was then moved to a staff position at HQ Hong Kong (where he again chose to move out of the Senior Officers' mess).

=== Malaya ===
In January 1950 Calvert was asked by General Sir John Harding, at the suggestion of Field Marshal Sir William Slim, to produce a report on how to respond to the escalating violence in the Malayan Emergency. Sir John Harding was the Commander of British Forces in the Far East, Field Marshal Slim was Chief of the Imperial General Staff. Slim had fought in Burma at the same time as Calvert, and recognised Calvert as "perhaps the greatest expert on guerrilla warfare then serving in the British Army".

The Malayan Emergency was declared by the British in 1948 in response to violence from Chinese communists (originally trained by the British to fight the Japanese during WW2). The Emergency lasted until 1960. The initial phase of the Emergency between 1948 and 1950 has been described as a disorganised series of ad-hoc military measures, rather than an integrated campaign directed by a clear strategy. More than a thousand people had died, on both sides, by March 1950, and no end to the conflict was in sight. Fresh ideas were needed as much as more troops.

Calvert set off on an extensive tour of Malaya, sending interim reports to Harding as he travelled. He found the regular army poorly suited to jungle warfare, in very much the same way that Walter Walker had found in 1948 when setting up Ferret Force, and Frank Kitson was to find later in 1957 when reviewing counterinsurgency tactics. In Walker's words: "The qualities required of the real jungle fighter are not those of the elephant but rather of the poacher, gangster and cat-burglar". As the bandits retreated deeper into the jungle, it was difficult for the regular army to follow.

Calvert submitted a manuscript report direct to Harding in April 1950. He made recommendations at two levels: a high level, overarching recommendation that had to be done before all the others; and then more detailed recommendations to follow. His high-level recommendation was simple to state:

"There must be one man, with one plan, and with the power to carry it out."

==== Briggs Plan ====
In his biography, Calvert's Intelligence officer, Major John Woodhouse, lists six other recommendations from a copy of Calvert's report which had gone directly to Lt.- Gen. Sir Harold Briggs, the first Director of Operations:

- Police should stop sending patrols into jungle and concentrate on protection of civilians at jungle fringes
- Special Branch should be expanded
- Essential to move isolated Chinese, known as squatters into new villages where they could be protected – would involve hundreds of thousands of people
- Army to concentrate on setting ambushes near jungle edge to intercept Communists as they come out for food or offensive forays
- Only then, main military effort should concentrate on Johore in South Malaya with the aim of clearing the country methodically from South to North
- And then and only then, set up Special Force to operate for long periods in deep jungle. These Special Force operations to be complementary to those of infantry at jungle fringes.

These ideas appear in what became known as the 'Briggs Plan', put forward by Briggs in May 1950. At Slim's request, Briggs had come out of retirement to be appointed to his role in March 1950, arriving in Singapore on 3 April. The first draft of the Briggs Plan appears to have been put together in about a week, suggesting Briggs drew on and integrated existing proposals. Briggs' military role in Malaya was highly political, for example persuading Malay Sultans to make concessions to the Chinese population. Calvert described him as "a wise old man who wanted me to advise him on the Briggs Plan". Several commentators suggest that Calvert's report shaped the Briggs Plan, one even suggesting that it could be referred to as the Calvert Plan.

Calvert had put his finger on growing tensions between the military and civil administrations in Malaya. Politicians and civil administrators saw the Emergency as a predominantly military problem, to be solved by military action before civil or political change; the military recognised the limitations of military action and wanted faster civil and political change. Civil issues such as settlement and control of Chinese squatters, propaganda, immigration control and resolution of labour disputes were seen by Field Marshal Slim and General Harding as an essential part of the counterinsurgency. They wanted the tasks of controlling and protecting the population and gathering intelligence to be done by the police and the civil services. The High Commissioner and senior members of the civil service wanted the army to be responsible for these tasks, and did not want to risk a political confrontation with Malay elites, who were deeply opposed to investment and the extension of political rights to the Chinese squatters. The army, police, civil authorities and the sultans were all pulling in different directions and needed one man in charge and one plan they could all follow.

Implementation of the Briggs Plan began in the southern state of Johore on 1 June 1950. Over the following year, violence increased, and tension continued to grow between civil and military administrations, to the extent that at one point Briggs even threatened to resign. Then, in October 1951, a few months before Briggs' impending retirement, the High Commissioner was killed in a terrorist attack. When Winston Churchill returned to power as British Prime Minister later that month, the decision was taken to appoint one man, General Sir Gerald Templer, as both the military Director of Operations and the civil High Commissioner, with unprecedented Emergency powers, "greater than any British soldier had enjoyed since Cromwell".

Templer took up his post in February 1952 to complete implementation of the Briggs Plan, just as Calvert had recommended. Calvert even claimed to have suggested Templer for the post when he made his original report ("because he is ruthless and has got charm and is highly intelligent"). With full power over all civil and military resources, Templer pushed changes through. Between August 1951 and July 1954 the communist terrorists (as they were now called) lost over half their strength, and security force and civilian casualties declined to less than one seventh of their peak. The back of the revolt was broken.

Unfortunately, Calvert was no longer in Malaya to see this happen. He had suffered from amoebic dysentery since January 1951, and in June 1951 had become seriously unwell, reportedly suffering from hepatomegaly, dysentery, malaria, hookworm and the cumulative mental and physical stress of 12 years' intensive soldiering. On 8 June 1951, the day before Calvert told his men that he had to go into hospital and would be returning to the UK, General Briggs came to the Malayan Scouts HQ at Dusan Tua and spent many hours listening to reports of operations, having discussions with the officers, and talking with Calvert alone. The next time Major John Woodhouse saw Calvert was on 12 June, at the military hospital, to say goodbye.

==== Malayan Scouts (SAS) ====
Whilst all the politicking over the Briggs Plan was taking place, Calvert had been focused on implementing his last recommendation, setting up a Special Force to operate for up to three months in the deep jungle, or, in his words:

"To form a special counter-insurgency force which would live, move and have its being in the jungle, alongside, in the same blood stream as the guerrillas, so that they would meet, and - if they were well trained enough, smart enough, well armed enough - they would beat them."

In July 1950 Calvert was given the go-ahead to set up his counter-insurgency force as quickly as possible under the name Malayan Scouts (SAS), reporting directly to General Urquhart, the General Officer Commanding (GOC) in Malaya (whose attitude towards the SAS and small unit jungle patrols may best be described as ambivalent). Calvert had already started interviewing officer volunteers in Hong Kong in June 1950. The unit began forming on 1 August 1950. By his own account, setting up the Malayan Scouts was a great challenge for Calvert, making him work as hard as he had ever worked in his life. He was given very little administrative support and was under constant pressure (from Urquhart) to get results quickly. Recruitment was a particular problem:

"I was not allowed to pick and chose my Other Ranks. I sent a request for volunteers to all the Army battalions in Hong Kong and Malaya, but I had to let the battalion commanders choose the men and send them to me. Some chose to off-load their unruly elements on me and whilst I could RTU them (return to unit), I was not allowed to pick them. I was allowed to pick and choose officers, but only from South East Asia; Hong Kong and Malaya. This was in many ways due to the very big anti-Chindit element amongst the former Indian Army officers, dating back to the Burma days."

Notable successful recruits included John Woodhouse, Intelligence Officer and Squadron Commander, who went on to be CO of 22SAS; and Dare Newell, a former SOE officer who had helped to train the Malayan communists during WW2, was a Squadron Commander, and later became the SAS Regimental Adjutant in London acting as the link between 22SAS and the War Office.

Woodhouse in particular was a great admirer of Calvert. He said of Calvert: "As soon as I met him I knew he had that spark of genius that a solder is lucky to see at close quarters even once in his career"; "His faith and enthusiasm was infectious and exhilarating. Ideas flowed from him in a way which I had never heard from anyone else in the army...Up to that point in my life Calvert was the most impressive, free-thinking strategist I had ever met".

Despite difficulties, by the middle of August 1950 Calvert had recruited around 60 men and officers, enough to form 'A' Squadron. Initial training involved the use of air rifles and fencing masks, and live grenades. Calvert around this time also liaised with Special Branch, SOE and MI6 over the use of wartime deception programs, including doctoring of ammunition and booby-trapping. By the end of September 1950 'A' Squadron was ready for final jungle training, which Calvert himself ran in the jungle near Ipoh in the north of Malaya. His objective, he said, was to get the men "to think for themselves and not act on orders". By January 1951 they were judged ready for operations.

'A' Squadron under John Woodhouse were tasked with locating and destroying terrorist bases on the northern border of Johore with Pahang. Under the Briggs Plan, the main military effort since June 1950 had been to clear Johore of terrorists, moving methodically from South to North. The squadron had no air cover and were bogged down by the worst rains since 1926, so progress was slow, but at the end of February a three-man patrol spotted six terrorists walking through a clearing and followed them to their camp. The next day the patrol's troop attacked the camp, killing or dispersing the terrorists and capturing supplies destined for Jahore. A police post was established among the local tribes and became an intelligence source for later operations. After 3 months, 'A' Squadron returned from the jungle with its first operation deemed a success.

There to meet them back at camp were two new squadrons: 'B' Squadron had arrived from the UK in January 1951, formed from Brian Frank's 21SAS (TA) and including men from 1 and 2 SAS regiments from WW2, under Major Tony Greville-Bell; 'C' Squadron had arrived from Rhodesia in March 1951, under Major Peter Walls, after Calvert had made a recruiting visit to Rhodesia in January. Unfortunately, between March and June 1951 there were insufficient resources to train the two new squadrons to the same high level as the first squadron in small group jungle operations.

On one telling, Greville-Bell was appalled by the lack of discipline in 'A' Squadron, clashed with Calvert, resigned and returned to the UK. On another, Greville-Bell arrived thinking he was taking over from Calvert, so Calvert "had to get rid of him". A third version is that Greville-Bell, having temporarily relinquished his captaincy to serve as a lieutenant in Malaya, was concerned not just about the lack of discipline, but about the camp, the accommodation, and the training facilities, which were 'inadequate for men who may have had experience of war in Europe, but had no experience of jungle fighting'. Unhappy with Calvert's responses, he complained directly to General Harding. Harding interviewed Greville-Bell and then gave him a severe dressing-down for committing the unforgivable sin of complaining over the head of his CO. Greville-Bell was 'treated as a criminal', separated from the unit and posted to another area. He eventually returned to the SAS TA in the UK where he was promoted to the substantive rank of Major in 1955, retiring the following year. Calvert himself did not mention Greville-Bell when he wrote about his time in Malaya. He dryly observed: "Allowing the men to keep their beards when they came out [from the jungle], to the outrage of the military police and the resentment of other units, was clearly a mistake". Whatever the facts of the matter, the Malayan Scouts acquired a reputation for ill-discipline that stuck.

Calvert took every opportunity to defend the Scouts, comparing his work to a building site, never neat and tidy in the construction phase, and pointing out that his men never got charged by the Military Police. He also said that he wanted to "establish a different type of discipline" with his troops, which made them think and use their initiative. He spoke about Wingate's idea with the Chindits, that anybody can fight with brilliant volunteers, the difficulty was to do it with ordinary people – you had to retrain them to give them initiative, taking away the discipline they had beforehand. He wanted to find infantrymen "who were prepared to fight off their own bat". On his first day with Woodhouse, he reportedly said: "There are too many officers who put their preconceived ideas into practice. There is not enough thinking out there. They are so stereotyped and moulded by the service that they are incapable of change...There are no manuals or battle drills to tell us the answer. We have got to find the answers ourselves. A new sort of war requires a new sort of counter war."

Several commentators have expressed sympathy for Calvert, given the challenging environment in which he worked. John Woodhouse wrote an open letter to the SAS Association in 1981 defending Calvert's reputation. Other authors have said that Calvert has never been given proper recognition for his achievements.

After Calvert fell ill and returned to the UK, command of the Malayan Scouts passed to Lieutenant Colonel Sloane in July 1951. Sloane, by his own account, "had nothing whatsoever to do with the SAS, or anything approaching it, during my service". He "cleared out the dead wood" and "cleansed" the regiment, bringing back "more conventional measures of discipline" and "normal military order". Both Woodhouse and Newell were persuaded to stay with the regiment, and by the end of 1951 all three squadrons were deployed in Jahore, but in infantry roles at the jungle fringes, losing, or never learning, the art of small force jungle operations.

In December 1951 a letter was sent from General Headquarters Far East Land Forces to the Under Secretary of State at The War Office in London about the future of the Malayan Scouts. It said:

"The role of the Malayan Scouts (Special Air Service Regiment) is to operate in the deep jungle areas not already covered by other Security Forces, with the object of destroying bandit forces, their camps and their sources of supply. No other units in Malaya are so suitably organised or equipped for this task which is vital in bringing the bandits to battle. The result is that the unit is becoming a 'Corps d'Elite' in deep jungle operations and is a most valuable component of our armed forces in Malaya...The Regiment is having increasing successes in their operations all the time".

The letter went on to recommend that the regiment be expanded to four squadrons, and renamed the 22nd Special Air Service Regiment.

Some see this as a vindication of Calvert's vision and commitment against the odds. Others put it in the context of a longer term chain of decisions to re-form a regular SAS unit. When Calvert received the news, he had recovered from his illness and had already been posted to Hanover, Germany, with the British Army on the Rhine as a Commander with the Royal Engineers.

Further vindication for Calvert came from John Woodhouse, his Intelligence Officer and Squadron Commander. When, after his 18 month tour (of which 14 months had been spent in the jungle), Woodhouse returned to the UK, he said there were three essential conditions for the future of the Regiment:

- The men for the regiment must be carefully selected
- The internal administration and discipline must be good
- Calvert's tactics, together with the risks inherent in them, must be accepted.

In 1952 Woodhouse ran the first post-war selection course for the SAS on Mount Snowdon in Wales. He then wrote a short paper, "Some Personal Observations on the Employment of Special Forces in Malaya" which was published in the Army Quarterly in April 1953. In the paper he described Calvert's approach and called for a return to patrolling the jungle in small independent groups.

He then worked with Dare Newell (from 1954 the SAS liaison officer based in London) and Stuart Perry (who had served as a troop commander under Newell in Malaya) to refine the selection process, staying in touch when he later returned to Malaya (Woodhouse was godfather to Perry's son). In 1955 Newell drafted a paper that echoes some of Calvert's words and still embodies the regiment's basic philosophy: "Selection is designed rather to find the individualist with a sense of self-discipline than the man who is primarily a good member of a team". Newell and Perry designed a selection process which combined David Stirling's requirements of fitness and endurance with the Special Operations Executive's need for initiative when alone in the field. Their selection course ran from 1956.

When Woodhouse returned for a second tour in Malaya in 1955 under Colonel George Lea, he served as both Squadron Commander and Training Officer, focusing on perfecting Calvert's ideas on jungle warfare. Woodhouse wrote:

"I moved from troop to troop with an escort of 2 or 3 soldiers. I got to know the area well. I kept a critical eye open for anything wrong. We mostly lived the 'hard routine' (silent, unseen) as we travelled. If I found fault then I had it out with the Troop Commander on the spot first and then with his men. Exhorting, cajoling, explaining with persistence was initially exhausting to me, it seemed to be a one man crusade...but suddenly it seemed to click and come together."

At the end of his tour in 1956 Colonel Lea recommended Woodhouse for an OBE. His citation states: 'Many of the techniques now proving successful on deep jungle operations were conceived and developed by him personally and have now become standard procedure throughout the Regiment".

Woodhouse later stated that "Calvert was the originator of all the basic SAS tactics in Malaya".

A final vindication for Calvert's Malayan Scouts comes in a book by Dennis Holman titled Noone of the Ulu. Published in 1958, it tells the story of two anthropologists, Richard and Pat Noone, who helped British forces build relationships with the native tribes in the deep jungle, or 'ulu'. The foreword was written by Field Marshall Sir Gerald Templer, Calvert's "one man with one plan". Templer says:

"Our job at the time was to destroy the terrorists, and this was absorbing all our available resources...Pat Noone had discovered a tribe inhabiting the deep jungle of the main range, which is some of the most difficult and inaccessible jungle in the world...I only became aware of this tribe when large numbers of the terrorists withdrew into their Shangri-La. The terrorists dominated the aborigines, and made vital tactical use of their wonderful skill and jungle craft. At the best of times it had been difficult for our patrols to make contact with the enemy, who kept out of fights unless they had superiority in numbers and the advantage of surprise; but now contact became virtually impossible. The terrorists' aborigine allies would not only warn them of the approach of a patrol, but lead them away to safety by secret paths known only to the guides. Moreover, the terrain was unsuitable for the deployment of troops in large numbers. The obvious solution was to deny the aborigines of the deep jungle to the terrorists. But how was this to be done, and who was going to do it? ...[that] is the substance of this story...."

In telling the story, the author then mentions, by name, five members of 22SAS (Colonel George Lea, Major John Slim, Major John Cooper, Major Salmond, and Colonel Oliver Brooke). Six years after he left Malaya, the unit Calvert set up was still seeking out terrorists in the deep jungle.

=== Dismissal from the Army ===
In 1952 while serving with the Royal Engineers in Hanover, Germany, Calvert was court-martialled and dismissed from the army on a charge of "gross indecency with male persons". To his death, Calvert denied that he was guilty of the charge. His biographer strongly suspects Calvert was framed. Official records relating to the trial are sealed and due to be released in 2028.

== Later life ==
After the military Calvert tried several times tried to build a career as an engineer, including a spell making a new start in Australia, but his life in this period was plagued by alcoholism, and he resorted to hand-to-mouth manual itinerant work, and for a while he was a vagrant there. He later returned to England.

He wrote three books about his time in Burma with Wingate and the Chindits: Prisoners of Hope, Fighting Mad: One Man's Guerrilla War, and Chindits: Long Range Penetration. Subsequently, he was appointed research fellow at the University of Manchester in 1971 to write "The Pattern of Guerrilla Warfare", which was never finished. He also contributed to the acclaimed British documentary television series, The World at War. He is interviewed in the fourteenth episode, "It's a Lovely Day Tomorrow – Burma (1942–1944)". He also appeared on film in the 2001 documentary series Gladiators of World War II episode 11, entitled "The Chindits".

With little money in his final years, he was compelled to sell his military medals and decorations in 1997.

Calvert died in his 85th year on 26 November 1998 in Richmond-upon-Thames. Up until his death he was a supporter of The Chindits Old Comrades Association and other charities for the support of ex-servicemen. His body was cremated at the Chilterns Crematorium in Amersham, in the county of Buckinghamshire.

== Legacy and reputation ==
Calvert is remembered first and foremost for his outstanding bravery and intrepid leadership during the Chindit campaigns. He was a Brigadier with two DSOs by the time he was thirty, and had been recommended by his three battalion commanders for a VC.

Less well known are his contributions to the post-war development of the SAS, not just in championing the SAS cause immediately after the war, but also in Malaya, where his achievements were overshadowed by the Malayan Scout's reputation for poor discipline, and by his court martial.

Specifically, in Malaya:

- Calvert's ideas informed the Briggs Plan. The Briggs Plan was codified by Sir Robert Thompson in the book Defeating Communist Insurgency, which brought Thompson international recognition - he had the ear of three US Presidents on Vietnam (and even got a mention in the film Apocalypse Now). Thompson's book was given by British diplomats to the Sultan of Oman in 1966 to provoke discussion about social change as a defence against insurgency. The changes had to wait until after the Oman coup in 1970, when the SAS returned to help the new Sultan Qaboos win the Dhofar Counterinsurgency, seen by some as the most successful counterinsurgency of modern times.
- Calvert's ideas led to the formation of the Malayan Scouts to fight in the deep jungle. His jungle warfare tactics were taken up and codified by John Woodhouse, then used by John Watts, Peter de la Billiere and Tony Jeapes at the start of their SAS careers in Malaya, then applied with great success in Borneo. Watts, De la Billiere and Jeapes became COs of 22SAS and went on to lead the SAS in the Dhofar Counterinsurgency.
- Calvert's experience and ideas on soldier selection influenced Woodhouse, Newell and Perry who set up the first post-war SAS selection process. Their work shaped the selection process of the modern SAS.

Calvert is also remembered, perhaps unfairly, for the allegedly poor discipline of some members of 'A' Squadron Malayan Scouts between August 1950 and June 1951.

== Honours and awards ==
- Distinguished Service Order 5 August 1943, 18 May 1944
- Silver Star (United States) 19 September 1944
- King Haakon VII's Cross of Liberty (Norway) 19 March 1948
- Commander of the Order of Leopold II with Palm (Belgium)
- Croix de Guerre 1940 with Palm (Belgium) 14 May 1948

== Sources ==
- Allen, Louis (1998). Burma: The Longest War, 1941–45. London: Phoenix Giant. ISBN 0-7538-0221-X.
- Bidwell, Shelford (1979). The Chindit War: Stilwell, Wingate, and the Campaign in Burma: 1944. New York: Macmillan. ISBN 978-0-02-510600-0.
- Calvert, Michael (1974) Chindits: Long Range Penetration New York: Ballantine Books
- Calvert, Michael (1973) Slim New York: Ballantine Books
- Calvert, Michael (1964). Fighting Mad: One Man's Guerrilla War. London: Jarrolds Publishers.
- Calvert, Michael (1952). Prisoners of Hope. London: Jonathan Cape.
- Charters, David (2009). "The Development of British Counter-Insurgency Intelligence". Journal of Conflict Studies. 29. Journal of Conflict Studies Volume 29, Spring 2009. ISSN 1715-5673.
- Deane-Drummond, Anthony (1992). Arrows of Fortune. Leo Cooper. ISBN 978-0850523232.
- De la Billiere, Peter (1994). Looking For Trouble. BCA. ISBN 978-0002552455.
- Dickens, Peter (1983). S.A.S.: The Jungle Frontier - 22nd Special Air Service Regiment in the Borneo Campaign, 1963-66 (1st ed.). Book Club Associates. ISBN 978-0853685975.
- Geraghty, Tony (1992). Who Dares Wins: The SAS, 1950 to the Gulf War (3rd ed.). Time Warner Books UK. ISBN 978-0316903240.
- Goodman, Joshua (2021). "Shirking the Briggs Plan: Civilian Resistance to Reform and the Army's Struggle for Control in Malaya, 1950–1952". The Journal of Imperial and Commonwealth History. 49 (4): 742–776. doi:10.1080/03086534.2021.1883244.
- Hack, Karl (2009). The Malayan Emergency As Counterinsurgency Paradigm (PDF). The Open University.
- Hack, Karl (2022). The Malayan Emergency: Revolution and Counterinsurgency at the End of Empire. Cambridge University Press. ISBN 978-1107439481.
- Hoe, Alan (25 April 2019). Keystone of 22 SAS: The Life and Times of Lieutenant Colonel J M (Jock) Woodhouse MBE MC. Pen & Sword Military. ISBN 978-1526745057.
- Holman, Dennis (1958). Noone Of The Ulu (3rd ed.). The Travel Book Club. ISBN 978-0195826104.
- Jeapes, Tony (1980). SAS Operation Oman (3rd ed.). William Kimber. ISBN 978-0718300180.
- Jones, Tim (2005). SAS: The First Secret Wars (1st ed.). I. B. Tauris. ISBN 978-1860646768.
- Kitson, Frank (1977). Bunch Of Five (1st ed.). Faber & Faber. ISBN 978-0571149803.
- Latimer, Jon (2004). Burma: The Forgotten War. London: John Murray. ISBN 0-7195-6576-6.
- MacKenzie, Alastair (2011). Special Force: The Untold Story of 22nd Special Air Service Regiment (SAS) (1st ed.). I. B. Tauris. ISBN 978-1848850712.
- Nagl, John (2002). Learning To Eat Soup With A Knife: Counterinsurgency Lessons from Malaya and Vietnam (1st ed.). University of Chicago Press. ISBN 978-0226567709.
- Rooney, David (1995). Burma Victory: Imphal, Kohima and the Chindit issue, March 1944 to May 1945. New York: Arms and Armour Press.
- Rooney, David (1997). Mad Mike: A Biography of Brigadier Michael Calvert. Pen & Sword. ISBN 978-0850525434.
- Slim, William (1957). Defeat into Victory. London: The Reprint Society.
- Strawson, John (1984). A History of the S.A.S. Regiment (2nd ed.). Secker & Warburg. ISBN 978-0436499920.
- Thompson, Robert (1966). Defeating Communist Insurgency: Experiences From Malaya and Vietnam (1st ed.). Chatto & Windus. ISBN 978-0701111335.
- Thompson, Robert (1989). Make for the Hills: Memories of Far Eastern Wars (1st ed.). Leo Cooper. ISBN 978-0850527612.
- Warner, Philip (1985). The Special Air Service. London: Harper Collins. ISBN 978-0718301729.
- Woodhouse, John (1953). Some Personal Observations On The Employment Of Special Forces In Malaya. The Army Quarterly Vol LXVI no.1 April 1953.
