= John Woodhouse (British Army officer) =

British Army officer (1922–2008)

- Born: 29 September 1922; Kensington, London, England
- Died: 15 February 2008 (aged 85); Dorset, England
- Military career
- Allegiance: United Kingdom
- Branch: British Army
- Service years: 1942–1965
- Rank: Lieutenant colonel
- Nickname: "Jock"
- Service number: 235637
- Unit: Dorset Regiment
- Commands: 22nd SAS Regiment
- Conflicts: Second World War; Malayan Emergency; Indonesia–Malaysia confrontation North Yemen Civil War
- Awards: Member of the Order of the British Empire; Military Cross
- Other work: Chairman Hall & Woodhouse

Lieutenant Colonel John Michael Woodhouse, MBE, MC (29 September 1922 – 15 February 2008) was a British Army officer credited with helping to reform the Special Air Service.

In 1956 he was appointed an MBE for doing "more to enhance the operational reputation and technical skill of 22 Special Air Service Regiment than any other officer since the unit's formation six years ago".

He was described by David Stirling as a man "who created the modern SAS during the Malayan campaign by restoring to the regiment its original philosophy”.

== Early years ==
John "Jock" Woodhouse was born in Kensington, London, on 29 September 1922, the only son of Brigadier Charles Woodhouse, a former Colonel of the Dorset Regiment. He received his education at Malvern College and commissioned into the Dorset Regiment in 1942.

== Military career ==
=== Second World War ===
Woodhouse was not a member of the SAS during the Second World War. He fought with the East Surrey Regiment in Tunisia, Sicily, and Italy. While commanding with 1st Battalion, East Surrey Regiment, he received his Military Cross for leading an attack on buildings occupied by tank crews which turned out to be the headquarters of the 16th Panzer Division. In March 1944, a patrol he was commanding was ambushed near Cassino and he was taken prisoner and held until the 125th US Cavalry Regiment arrived on 12 April 1945.

Rejoining the army after the war, he completed a Russian course in September 1946, and was posted to Germany to work first for Allied Control Commission, then in September 1947 for the Anglo-Soviet Border Commission in Lübbecke. In 1948 he was in Austria, second-in-command of a company in the 1st Battalion, the Dorset Regiment. An accomplished skier, he came third in the British Army Ski Championships in 1949.

=== SAS years ===
In 1950, he was sent to Hong Kong as part of the Divisional Intelligence Cell of the newly formed 40th Infantry Division, there to deter the Chinese Communist Army under Mao Tse-tong from invading the British colony. In Hong Kong he worked for Brigadier ‘Mad Mike’ Calvert, a former Chindit and SAS commander during WW2. When Calvert was put in charge of raising a ‘Special Force’ for Malaya, to operate in the deep jungle, befriend local tribes, and hunt down Communist terrorists, Woodhouse volunteered, saying, of Calvert: “As soon as I met him I knew he had that spark of genius that a soldier is lucky to see at close quarters even once in his career".

==== Malaya ====
On 19 August 1950 Woodhouse flew from Hong Kong to Malaya to take up his post as Intelligence Officer with the Malayan Scouts under Calvert, now promoted to Lieutenant Colonel. The Scouts moved to their new camp at Dusan Tua on 29 September 1950 to complete jungle training, and in January 1951 'A' Squadron was judged ready for operations.

Woodhouse and about 60 men in ‘A’ Squadron were tasked with locating and destroying terrorist bases on the northern border of Johore with Pahang. Under the Briggs Plan, the main military effort since June 1950 had been to clear Johore of terrorists, moving methodically from South to North. The squadron had no air cover and were bogged down by the worst rains since 1926, so progress was slow, but at the end of February a three-man patrol spotted six terrorists walking through a clearing and followed them to their camp. The next day the patrol's troop attacked the camp, killing or dispersing the terrorists and capturing supplies destined for Jahore. A police post was established among the local tribes and became an intelligence source for later operations. After 3 months, ‘A’ Squadron returned from the jungle with its first operation deemed a success.

Overall, the initial results of the re-formed SAS were not as successful as had been hoped. Although Calvert was inspirational, he could also be controversial: some saw him as releasing men from jail to put them into soldiering - not ineffective, but wild and undisciplined. Woodhouse himself commented that he found the troops "not up to scratch...extremely careless, very noisy and rather bored, going round the jungle in a slaphappy way".

Early in 1951 'B' Squadron arrived from the UK, recruited from 21 SAS (Territorial Army) and men from 1st and 2nd SAS regiments from WW2, under the command of Major Tony Greville-Bell, himself a veteran of Stirling's SAS. On some accounts, Greville-Bell was appalled by the lack of discipline of the troops in Malaya, clashed with Calvert, resigned and returned to the UK.

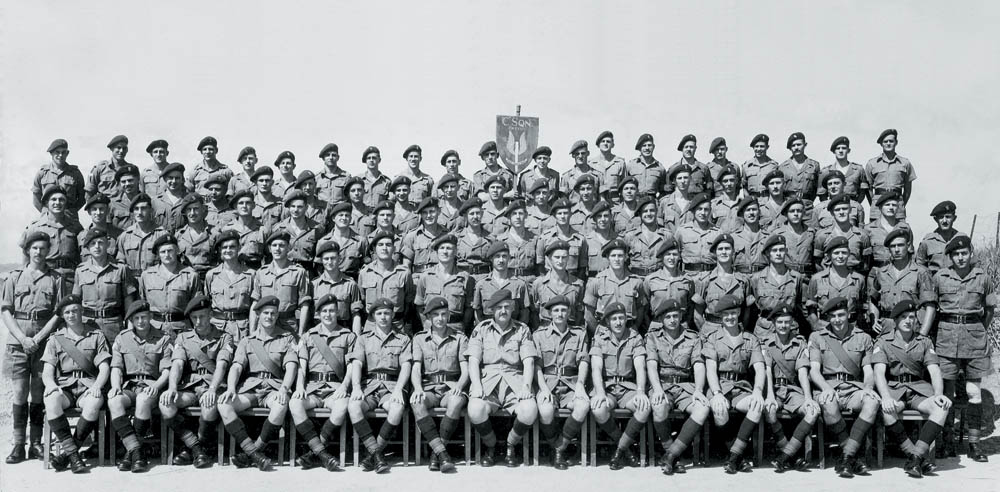
"C" Squadron (Rhodesian) SAS in 1953, in Malaya.

In June 1951 Calvert fell ill and was medically evacuated to the UK. He never returned to Malaya, ending his military career under something of a cloud. Woodhouse was put in charge of 'B' Squadron, and was joined by 'C' Squadron under Major Peter Walls. 'C' Squadron were formed mainly from Rhodesian SAS and were highly professional, serving in Malaya until 1953.

Lieutenant Colonel John Sloane of the Argyll and Sutherland Highlanders took over command of the Scouts from Calvert in July 1951, to “clear out dead wood” and “cleanse” the regiment, bringing ‘more conventional measures of discipline’ and ‘normal military order’. By the end of 1951 all three squadrons were deployed in Jahore, but in infantry roles at the jungle fringes, losing, or never learning, the art of small force jungle operations. The regiment moved to Singapore and was officially re-titled the 22 SAS Regiment in 1952.

Woodhouse returned to the UK at the end of his tour in March 1952. Before flying back, he trained a new troop which included John Slim, a future CO of 22 SAS. Woodhouse had spent 14 months of his 18-month tour in the jungle. He left with three clear convictions:

1. The men for the regiment must be carefully selected
2. The internal administration and discipline must be good
3. Calvert's tactics, together with the risks inherent in them, must be accepted.

He later said that the problem in the early days was an acute lack of training for the troops – that he and another officer tasked with training them had perhaps 9 months jungle experience between them, a case of ‘the blind leading the blind’.

Back in England, in September 1952 Woodhouse took command of ‘Z’ reservists and supervised their annual training. Many were former SAS veterans from WW2, and Woodhouse tapped their knowledge of operations and the wartime regiment's selection process. He then organised the first post-WW2 SAS selection course in Britain, for volunteers waiting to go to Malaya, criss-crossing Mount Snowdon in Wales. Woodhouse took part despite suffering a bout of malaria. In December 1952, his SAS duties completed, he returned to a relatively quiet life with the Dorset Regiment (TA) where he remained for the next two years.

In April 1953, a short paper Woodhouse had written, “Some Personal Observations on the Employment of Special Forces in Malaya” was published in the Army Quarterly. In the paper he describes his experience in Malaya from 1950 to 1952 with Calvert, and calls for a return to patrolling the jungle in small independent groups.

In May 1954 Major Dare Newell was appointed to the newly formed RHQ SAS in London. Newell had joined SOE's Force 136 to fight behind the lines in Albania and Malaya during WW2. Like Woodhouse, he had volunteered to join the Malayan Scouts, and had commanded a squadron in Malaya from 1952 to 1954. In his new London-based role, he liaised with Woodhouse and formally took over the SAS selection process]. The rigorous systems Woodhouse and Newell helped to develop become the basis of selection and training of the modern SAS.

In 1955 Newell drafted a paper many see as embodying the regiment's basic philosophy, in which he said: “Selection is designed rather to find the individualist with a sense of self-discipline than the man who is primarily a good member of a team.” The implication was that an individualist could always chose to be a team player, but a team player may not have the capacity to work on their own. SAS soldiers were expected to work for weeks or even months in isolation, in stressful conditions. Perhaps because of this, when Woodhouse took the Army Staff College exam in 1954, he failed - as did Peter de la Billiere a decade later (de la Billiere went on to become Director SAS and Commander British Forces during the Gulf War).

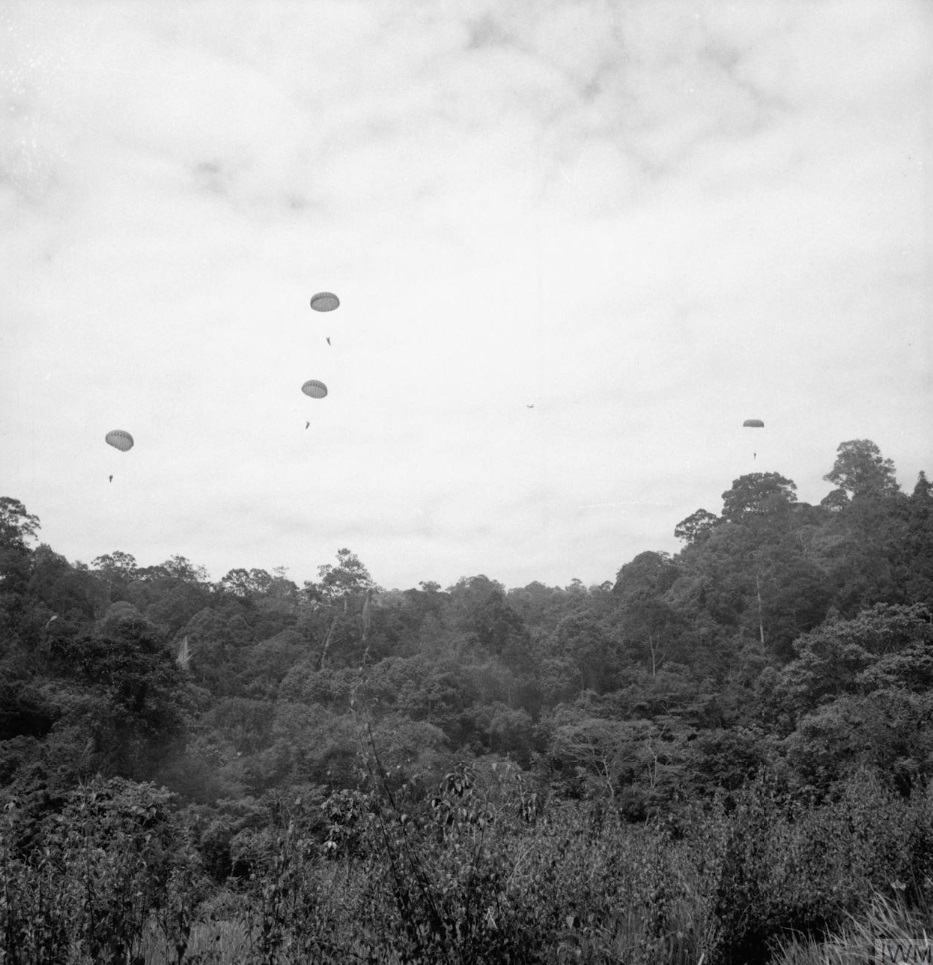
Parachutists from 22SAS descending into the jungle, Malaya, 1953

In January 1955 Lt. Col. George Lea became CO 22SAS with a mission to shake up the regiment and further improve operational methods. In March 1955, Lea brought Woodhouse back to Malaya as Training Officer, and put him in command of 'D' Squadron. In the three years that Woodhouse had been away, the regiment had become more mobile, having perfected 'tree jumping' (low-level parachute drops into the jungle), and making use of helicopters for one of the first times in a war zone. However, the priority for Woodhouse remained jungle craft, particularly the ‘hard routine’: how troops could hide their presence when in close proximity to the enemy. He consulted with anthropologists for advice on building relationships with the jungle tribes (seeing this as the main success of the SAS in Malaya), and wrote short, succinct operational notes for the troops, initially 3 pages and growing to 6 pages long. He wrote:

“I moved from troop to troop with an escort of 2 or 3 soldiers. I got to know the area well. I kept a critical eye open for anything wrong. We mostly lived the ‘hard routine’ as we travelled. If I found fault then I had it out with the Troop Commander on the spot first and then with his men. Exhorting, cajoling, explaining with persistence was initially exhausting to me, it seemed to be a one man crusade…but suddenly it seemed to click and come together."

In March 1956 Woodhouse was recalled to HQ Squadron to train newly joined officers and see how the efficiency of the squadron could be improved. One of the young officers passing through was Peter de la Billiere, who had undergone selection in October 1956 on Brecon Beacons during which he lost 15 pounds in weight. Dare Newell had run the selection and had informed him he had passed. In Malaya, de la Billiere describes a three-week intensive jungle training exercise run by Woodhouse, with 'five typed pages' of 'curt recommendations' aimed at preparing him for living in the jungle for weeks on end, moving silently, leaving no trace, ready to engage with the enemy at any moment.

At the end of his tour Lea recommended Woodhouse for an MBE. His citation states: 'Many of the techniques now proving successful on deep jungle operations were conceived and developed by him personally and have now become standard procedure throughout the Regiment".

In late 1956, before returning to the UK, Woodhouse describes in his diaries attending a funeral, at a cemetery near Kuala Lumpur, of a New Zealand SAS soldier killed in action: "The crosses of 20 SAS soldiers lay in this place - part of the price of freedom". Many others would also have suffered serious injuries. Colonel Oliver Brooke, CO of 22 SAS from 1953 to 1954, suffered a complicated leg fracture from a parachute jump which required months of hospital treatment in England and crippled him for life.

On return to the UK, Woodhouse became second-in-command of 21 SAS (TA) under Colonel David Sutherland, where he was responsible from late 1956 to 1958 for organising and supervising training for the European (nuclear Cold War) theatre. Just before Woodhouse took up his posting, Dare Newell, the SAS's link man in London, was appointed GS02 at the War Office, giving him better access to those who would decide the future of the SAS. Previously, while running the SAS selection process, Newell had worked with two clerks out of offices in Aldershot borrowed from the Parachute Regiment. During this time, Woodhouse would have been closely involved in discussions with Newell and a host of other leading Special Forces figures about the future of the regiment. Those involved included David Stirling, David Sutherland, Hugh Gillies (23 SAS), Ian Lapraik, Brian Franks (21 SAS), Stuart Perry and David Lloyd Owen.

By late 1958 the conflict in Malaya had been won, and most people in the SAS expected that the two remaining SAS sabre (fighting) squadrons would be disbanded on their return to the UK. Woodhouse, looking to his future, seriously considered leaving the army, but instead moved to 3 Para, where he was eventually given command of B Company at Aldershot. Then, in January 1959, the SAS successfully stormed the Jebel Akhdar in Oman, giving the regiment a new lease of life. To all those watching in the War Office, the Jebel Akhdar operation proved that the SAS could respond quickly and flexibly in a new environment with relatively few resources and with minimal publicity. In December 1959 Woodhouse was surprised to be asked to return to the SAS as second-in-command, to support the incoming new CO Dare Wilson, who had no prior SAS experience. Wilson's tasks as CO were to consolidate the roles and skills of 22 SAS and establish it in the British Army's order of battle. After some initial hesitation, Woodhouse was persuaded by Dare Newell to accept the post on 1 March 1960.

Over the next two years, the SAS were set up at a new base at Hereford and were given a new Cold War role. The squadrons started a wide-ranging training programme ‘for the mountains, for the jungle, for the arctic and for the desert’. An SAS soldier in 1962 recalls taking part in operations in 13 different countries in the first 8 months of the year. In mid-1961 Woodhouse was given a GS02 staff appointment in Aden (despite having previously failed the Staff College exam) as senior staff officer with the six-battalion force that comprised the Aden Protectorate Levies. On 1 July 1962 he took over from Dare Wilson as CO 22SAS.

==== Borneo ====
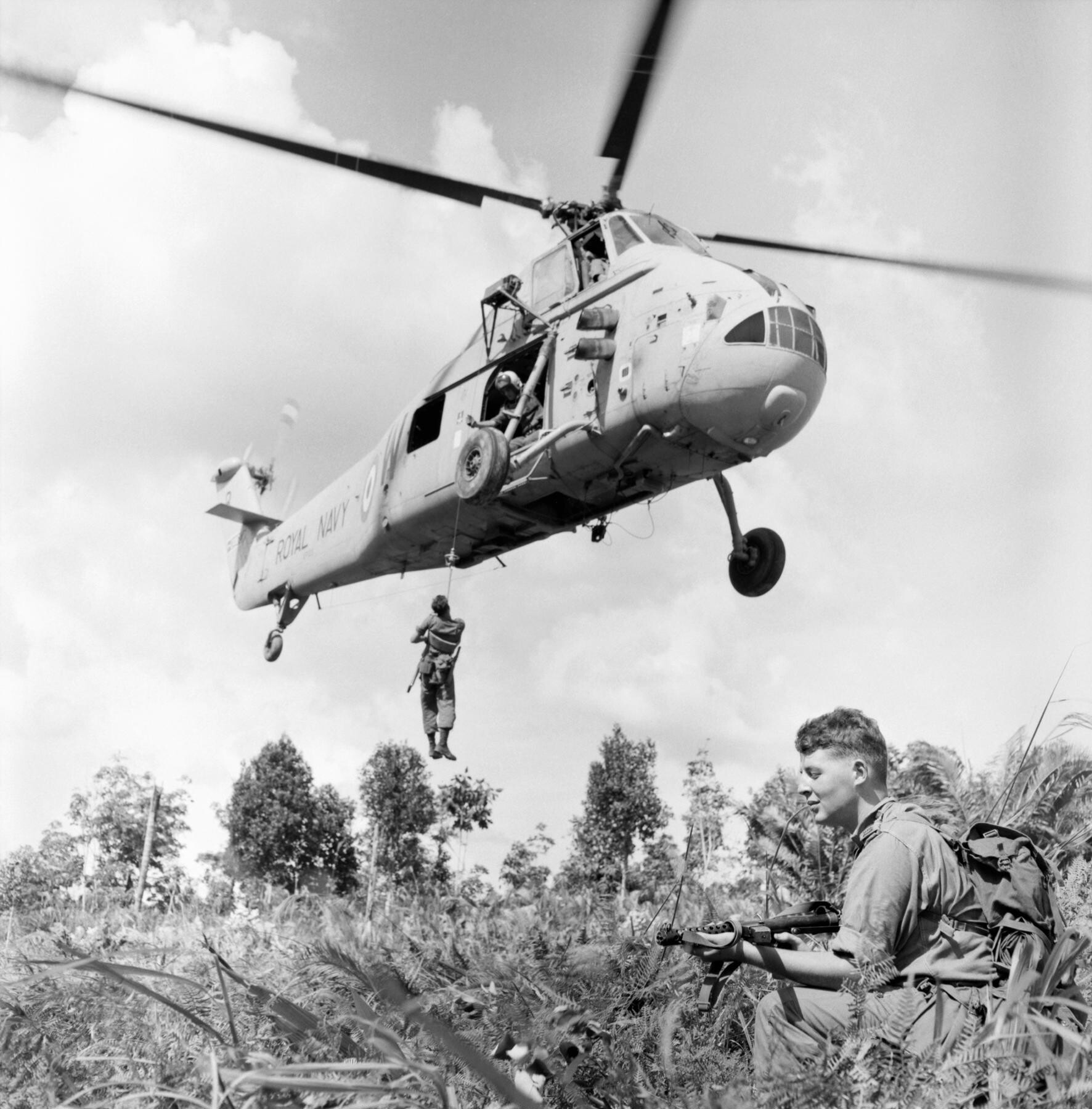
British soldiers in Borneo during the Indonesian Confrontation, August 1964

In January 1963 trouble broke out in the north of Borneo, at the start of the Indonesian Confrontation. President Sukarno of Indonesia objected to the ‘neocolonialist’ British plan to amalgamate the Federation of Malaya, Singapore and British Borneo (North Borneo and Sarawak) into the new country of Malaysia - the south of Borneo was, and still is, part of Indonesia. Small, ill-trained and poorly armed gangs of Indonesian insurgents started to cross the 900-mile Borneo border. Sensing an opportunity, Woodhouse approached the MoD, who sent him out to meet General Walter Walker, the Director of Operations in Borneo. Woodhouse convinced Walker of the value of the SAS and by mid-January 'A' Squadron was on the ground fielding twenty one Malay-speaking 2-man patrols scattered along the border villages, or kampongs. As in Malaya, British troops liaised with anthropologists with detailed knowledge of the jungle tribes. In May, 'A' Squadron handed over to 'D' Squadron. By 1964 more than 1,000 Border Scouts had been trained, helping to repulse Indonesian incursions.

In September 1963 the British embassy in Jakarta was stormed by angry Sukarno-supporting crowds, badly damaging the embassy. In an atmosphere of rising tension, the Indonesian government sent regular and elite soldiers (some of whom had been trained by US Special Forces) to fight alongside the border gangs in Borneo. General Walker asked Woodhouse to send a third SAS squadron. Woodhouse, already stretched with troops in Yemen, got permission to re-form 'B' Squadron, asking Major John Watts (who had led the SAS assault on the Jebel Akhdar) to train and lead the new (re-formed) squadron. During training in the UK, reports were received from Borneo of increasing Indonesian aggression and SAS actions in which men had been killed. 'D' Squadron arrived home exhausted. Watts took his new recruits to Brunei for final jungle training in October 1964, then in November started operations as part of the highly classified Operation Claret.

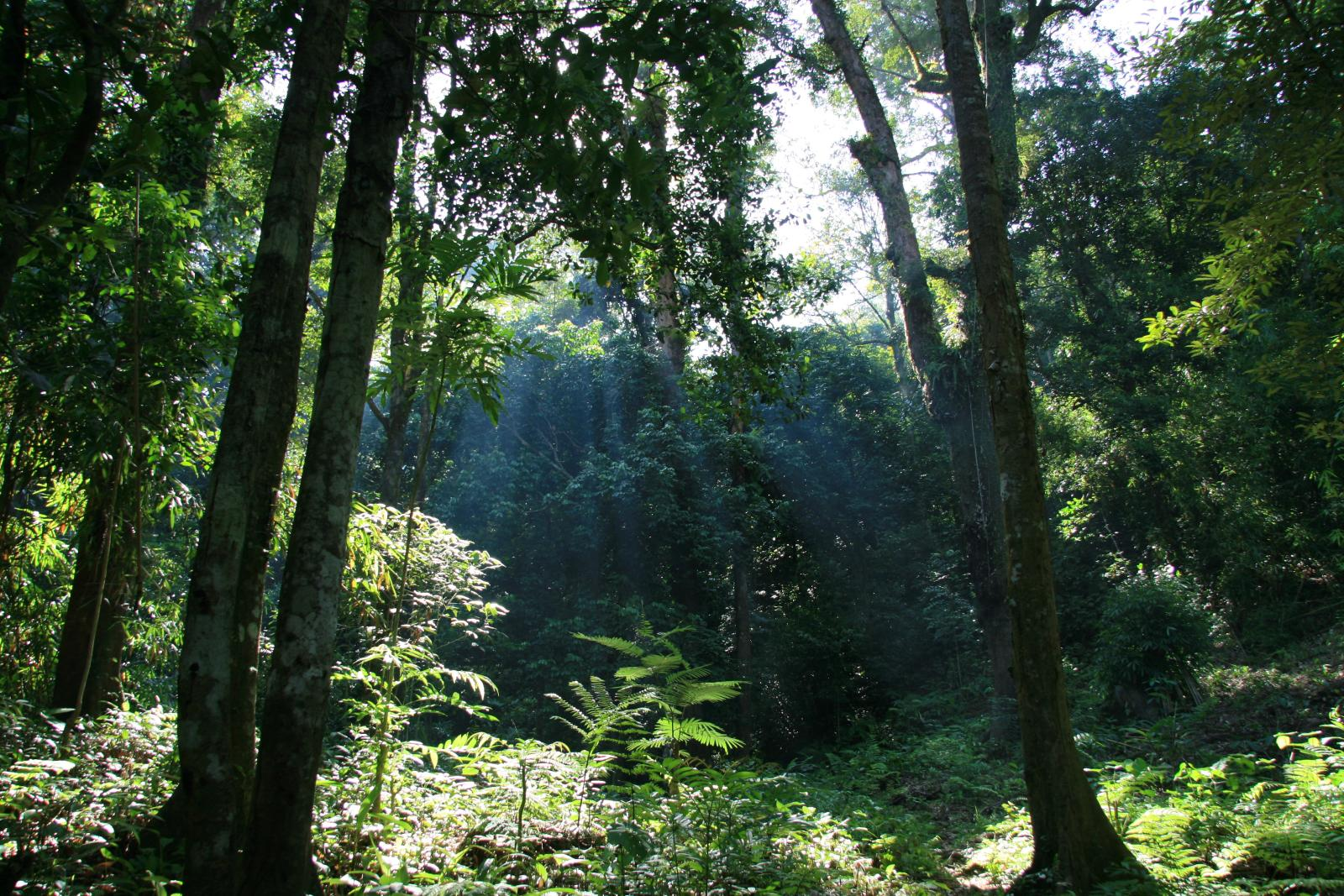
Gunung Palung Jungle, Kalimantan, Indonesia

Under Operation Claret, Woodhouse sent Watts and his squadron up to six miles into the jungle across the Indonesian border, three times further than had been allowed before, to conduct covert reconnaissance so that British infantry and Gurkha units (which reported to Watts) could make ‘psychological rapier thrusts’ against Indonesian forces. The idea was to detect and engage infiltrators before they left Indonesian territory. SAS troops provided medical and other forms of assistance to indigenous tribes along the border to build trust and a network of local ‘eyes and ears’. Secrecy was paramount, as the British Government did not want this to be seen as an act of war against Indonesia.

Watts and 'B' Squadron successfully completed their first tour in February 1965, with no casualties. A refreshed 'D' Squadron returned to carry on their cross-border work. The operations of the SAS in Borneo helped to stabilize the situation until Indonesia fell apart after the October 1965 coup and subsequent Indonesian genocide. General Walker, who had requested the extra SAS squadron, later commented that "one SAS squadron with helicopters was worth ten infantry battalions to me". Denis Healey, the British Minister of Defence at the time, stated that Borneo was "a textbook demonstration of how to apply economy of force, under political guidance for political ends”. Of Woodhouse, he said: "He was, by common consent among the few who knew his record, the greatest guerrilla warrior yet produced by the West – a man to compare with Ho Chi Min”.

In December 1964 Woodhouse's period of command of 22SAS came to an end, and he chose to retire from the British Army, reportedly telling John Watts to "work hard to be a General".

==== Yemen and after ====
In April 1964 'A' Squadron had been sent to Yemen. It had lost two of its men while operating north of Aden in the Radfan mountains. They had been tasked with night reconnaissance in rebel territory to identify possible drop zones for the Parachute Regiment. The bodies of the two SAS men were decapitated and the heads displayed at a rebel stronghold inside Yemen.

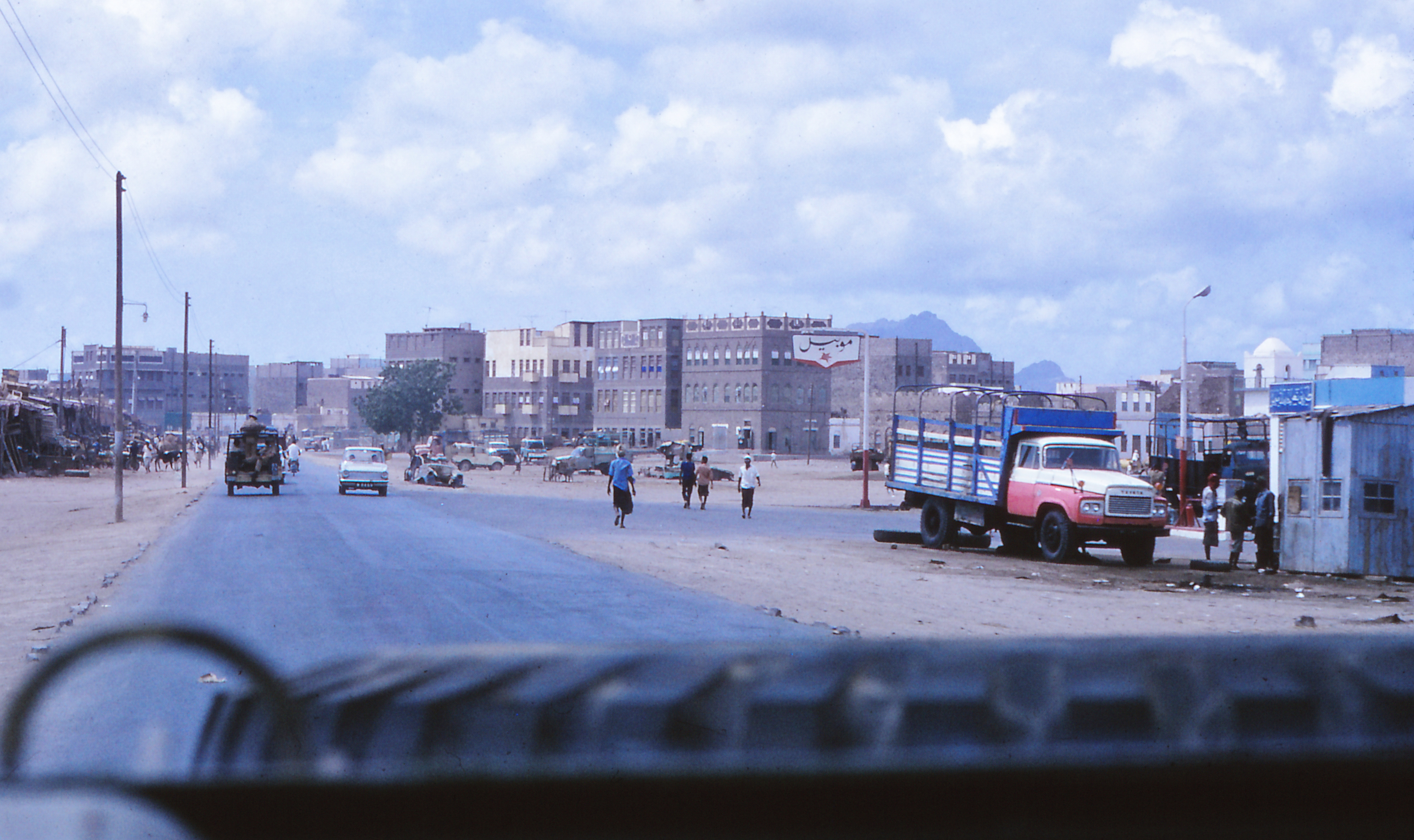
A vulnerable section of the road to Radfan Camp from Checkpoint Golf, known as "Grenade Corner", Aden, 1967

In June 1965 Woodhouse, now officially retired from the British Army, was asked by David Stirling to lead a small ex-SAS team to the Yemen to assist Royalist forces in their attack on an Egyptian airfield at Sana'a. Stirling and Woodhouse believed it was in British interests to force the Egyptians out of Yemen and so quell terrorism in South Arabia. This followed earlier preparatory work in Yemen by Johnny Cooper and Peter de la Billiere. British covert activity in Yemen continued under David Smiley until November 1967. Woodhouse continued to advise Watchguard (International) Ltd., the private company set up by ex-members of the SAS to help governments of friendly countries combat terrorism and insurgency, and was also an advisor to the Foreign Office.

Later, when Stirling hit the headlines in the UK with the launch of his political organization, GB75, in response to the economic and political travails of the mid-1970s, Woodhouse wrote a letter to Stirling, which was subsequently published, distancing himself from the initiative.

== Brewing and later life ==
Upon retirement, Woodhouse joined the family business, Hall & Woodhouse Brewery, Blandford St Mary, Dorset, where from scratch, he created the successful children's soft drink brand, Panda Pops, becoming the managing director of this division. He was involved in local forestry management and, from 1976 to 1984, he served as chairman of the SAS Association.

== Sources and further reading ==
- Asher, Michael (4 October 2018). The Regiment: The Definitive Story of the SAS. Penguin. ISBN 978-0241985939.
- Bevins, Vincent (2020). The Jakarta Method: Washington's Anticommunist Crusade and the Mass Murder Program that Shaped Our World (1st ed.). PublicAffairs. ISBN 978-1541742406.
- Deane-Drummond, Anthony (1992). Arrows of Fortune. Leo Cooper. ISBN 978-0850523232.
- De la Billiere, Peter (1994). Looking For Trouble. BCA. ISBN 978-0002552455.
- Dickens, Peter (30 January 2016). SAS: Secret War in South East Asia. Frontline Books. ISBN 978-1473855991.
- Dickens, Peter (1983). S.A.S.: The Jungle Frontier - 22nd Special Air Service Regiment in the Borneo Campaign, 1963-66 (1st ed.). Book Club Associates. ISBN 978-0853685975.
- Geraghty, Tony (1992). Who Dares Wins: The SAS, 1950 to the Gulf War (3rd ed.). Time Warner Books UK. ISBN 978-0316903240.
- Goodman, Joshua (2021). Shirking the Briggs Plan: Civilian Resistance to Reform and the Army’s Struggle for Control in Malaya, 1950–1952. The Journal of Imperial and Commonwealth History. doi:10.1080/03086534.2021.1883244.
- Healey, Denis (1990). The Time Of My Life (1st ed.). Penguin. ISBN 978-0140153941.
- Hoe, Alan (25 April 2019). Keystone of 22 SAS: The Life and Times of Lieutenant Colonel J M (Jock) Woodhouse MBE MC. Pen & Sword Military. ISBN 978-1526745057.
- Holman, Dennis (1958). Noone Of The Ulu (3rd ed.). The Travel Book Club. ISBN 978-0195826104.
- Large, Lofty (1999). Soldier Against The Odds (2nd ed.). Mainstream Publishing. ISBN 978-1840181432.
- MacKenzie, Alastair (2011). Special Force: The Untold Story of 22nd Special Air Service Regiment (SAS) (1st ed.). I. B. Tauris. ISBN 978-1848850712.
- Rooney, David (1997). Mad Mike: A Biography of Brigadier Michael Calvert. Pen & Sword. ISBN 978-0850525434.
- Strawson, John (1984). A History of the S.A.S. Regiment (2nd ed.). Secker & Warburg. ISBN 978-0436499920.
- Walton, Harry (21 February 2008). "Former SAS commander and brewery chief dies at 85". Dorset Echo.
- Woodhouse, John (1953). Some Personal Observations On The Employment Of Special Forces In Malaya. The Army Quarterly Vol LXVI no.1 April 1953.
