= Operation Helsby =

Military operation conducted by British forces in Malaya in 1952

- Part of Malayan Emergency
Date	8 February–9 March 1952
Location	Belum Valley, Perak, Malaya (British Malaya) 5.8156192°N 101.51805527777778°E
Result	British-Commonwealth victory

Belligerents
(United Kingdom) British Empire; Australia	Malayan Communist Party

Commanders and leaders
Gerald Templer, British High Commissioner in Malaya; John Sloane; John Mortimer Warfield; Roy Carlin	Chin Peng, Chairman of the Malayan Communist Party; Abdullah C.D.; Rashid Maidin

Units involved
Malayan Scouts; 45 Commando; FMPF Jungle Company; No. 38 Squadron RAAF; No. 267 Squadron RAF; FEAF Casualty Evacuation Flight	10th Malay Regiment

Casualties and losses
21+	Unknown
- Location within Peninsular Malaysia

Operation Helsby was a British-led special forces military operation conducted from 8 February to 3 March 1952 in the Belum Valley, Perak, Malaya, during the Malayan Emergency. The primary objective of the operation was to flush out communist armed forces that had established the valley as a strategic base and stronghold and to dismantle the communist regiment operating there. According to historians such as Stavros Atlamazoglou, Dr Stephen Rookes, and Arthur D. Barontes, Operation Helsby was the first recorded special forces mission to utilise helicopters in direct support of ground units.

The operation was led by the Malayan Scouts (SAS), with support from 45 Commando of the 3 Commando Brigade and the Malayan Police Jungle Company (now known as the General Operations Force). Helicopter air support played a crucial role and was provided by the Far East Air Force (FEAF) Casualty Evacuation Flight, which was later upgraded to No. 194 Squadron RAF in 1953. Additional air support came from No. 267 Squadron of the Royal Air Force and No. 38 Squadron of the Royal Australian Air Force.

Although the operation succeeded in clearing the Belum Valley of communist forces, it came at a considerable cost: the Malayan Scouts suffered 21 casualties, with additional, unconfirmed losses likely among other supporting units. Despite the tactical success, the targeted communist force—later identified as the 10th Malay Regiment MNLA—managed to evade capture. The regiment subsequently relocated and continued its insurgent activities, contributing to the protracted conflict until the eventual ceasefire in 1989.

== Geography ==
Belum Valley is a fertile, forested region located deep within the rainforest of Perak, near the Malaya–Thailand border. The valley is traversed by a network of rivers that provide a reliable source of fresh water and support limited agricultural activities. Due to its remote location and natural resources, the valley was strategically used by the 10th Malay Regiment of the Malayan National Liberation Army as both a stronghold and a logistical hub for distributing supplies transported from Thailand.

The nearest town, Gerik, is approximately a 45-minute flight away using the helicopters available during the Malayan Emergency. Access to the valley is extremely limited, with the only viable routes being by foot or by air. This isolation, combined with its abundant natural resources, made Belum Valley a natural fortress ideally suited for guerrilla operations.

== Background ==
Operation Helsby marked the first major combat engagement undertaken by the Malayan Scouts involving the deployment of all its squadrons. Established in 1950 as a special forces unit, the Malayan Scouts had previously focused on small-unit long-range reconnaissance patrols and minor skirmishes but had not conducted a full-scale raid. With air support from the Far East Air Force (FEAF), the Royal Air Force (RAF) and the Royal Australian Air Force (RAAF), this operation also served as a valuable learning experience for the British, aimed at improving coordination between air and ground elements in joint operations.

=== Intelligence ===
The location of the enemy base was identified through a combination of reconnaissance missions conducted by smaller Malayan Scouts patrols and intelligence gathered from the indigenous Orang Asli. Due to the valley's remote and rugged terrain—conditions too extreme for conventional military units—the operation was assigned to the Malayan Scouts.

=== Strategy ===
Lieutenant Colonel John Sloane, the commanding officer of the Malayan Scouts, devised a pincer movement to maximise the effectiveness of his limited manpower. The strategy called for a two-pronged assault: one element would advance on foot toward the Belum Valley, while the other would be inserted by air to intercept retreating communist forces. All three squadrons of the Malayan Scouts were committed to the operation. To strengthen the effort, Lt Col Sloane requested additional combat support from the 3 Commando Brigade and the Malayan Police Jungle Company. Air support was secured from FEAF, RAF and RAAF. FEAF contributed two Dragonfly helicopters, while No. 267 Squadron RAF and No. 38 Squadron RAAF each provided two Dakota transport aircraft, bringing the total to four Dakotas for the mission.

=== The plan ===
The operational plan called for ground forces—comprising A Squadron, C Squadron, and the remaining elements of B Squadron of the Malayan Scouts, along with commandos from the 45 Commando and infantry from the Malayan Police Jungle Company—to advance on foot toward the Belum Valley three days prior to the main assault, forming the primary attack force. Once the ground units were in position, an airborne element consisting of 60 troopers from B Squadron of the Malayan Scouts would be inserted by parachute from Dakota aircraft to intercept any communist forces attempting to escape. Two Dragonfly helicopters were allocated for rapid troop insertion and casualty evacuation throughout the operation. The ground forces were tasked with raiding the valley and neutralising entrenched enemy positions.

== Battle ==
The battle commenced on 8 February 1952, when approximately 60 troopers from B Squadron of the Malayan Scouts were inserted into the Belum Valley by parachute from Dakota aircraft, with additional support from helicopters. Although the airborne insertion was executed as scheduled, the ground forces were significantly delayed due to the challenging jungle terrain. A march that would typically take three to four days extended well beyond that time frame, leaving the airborne troops isolated and vulnerable to enemy fire.

Without the immediate support of ground reinforcements, the airborne element came under heavy attack and was soon pinned down by entrenched communist forces. Most of the casualties sustained during the operation occurred during this early phase. In response, the two Dragonfly helicopters—originally designated for troop transport and medical evacuation—were repurposed for emergency close air support. Aircrews provided suppressive fire from the helicopters, while the Dakota aircraft flew low-altitude passes to divert enemy fire away from the beleaguered troops.

The intense engagement persisted until the delayed ground units finally reached the area, enabling the operation to proceed according to plan. With the arrival of reinforcements, the Dragonflies reverted to their original roles, conducting rapid troop insertions and evacuating the wounded. The operation continued until 3 March 1952, culminating in the successful clearance of the Belum Valley of communist forces.

== Casualties ==
It was reported that the Malayan Scouts alone suffered 21 casualties during the operation, with additional, though unconfirmed, casualties likely sustained by other supporting units. All wounded personnel were evacuated by Dragonfly helicopters to a field hospital in Gerik, approximately 45 minutes away by air.

== Aftermath ==
Most of the communist forces and leadership of the 10th Malay Regiment managed to escape, abandoning their stronghold and supplies at Belum Valley. (Note: Due to poor coordination between the ground and airborne elements, the element of surprise was lost, allowing the enemy leadership time to escape.) The regiment later regrouped elsewhere and continued its insurgent activities across Malaya until the signing of the peace agreement in 1989. Despite this, the operation provided valuable lessons for British and Commonwealth forces. It offered a new perspective on the use of helicopters in combat support roles—both for special operations and conventional missions. Additionally, the operation served as a critical learning experience for the Malayan Scouts in planning and executing large-scale raids involving multiple squadrons and joint-force coordination.
