= Ferret Force =

- Active: July to December 1948
- Country: United Kingdom
- Type: Special forces
- Role: Counter-insurgency; Direct action Forward observer Jungle warfare Raiding; Reconnaissance; Special reconnaissance
- Size: Company
- Engagements: Malayan Emergency

Commanders
- Notable commanders: Lieutenant-Colonel Walter Walker

Ferret Force was a counter-insurgency unit formed by the British and Malayan authorities as part of their response to the communist insurgency during the Malayan Emergency. The unit only existed for six months, but was to help establish doctrine for British operations in the jungle.

== Origins ==
During World War II, the Special Operations Executive (or SOE) formed teams composed of British operatives and Malayan guerillas to combat the Japanese. Initially, SOE operations in the Far East were under the control of a unit known as GS I(k). This designation was changed in 1944 to Force 136.

Initially, resistance to the Japanese forces which conquered Malaya were organized by the Communist-formed Malayan Peoples' Anti-Japanese Army or MPAJA. The MPAJA, and the Malayan Communist Party (MCP) in general, drew its support from the ethnic Chinese population living in Malaya. With British support for guerrilla operations in the Far East beginning in earnest, they were eventually able to support Lim Bo Seng's partisans in resisting the Japanese.

At the end of the war Force 136, like SOE in general, was disbanded. However, the MPAJA and the MCP did not disband. Instead, after a series of purges, they reemerged as the Malayan Peoples' Anti-British Army (MPABA), later renamed the Malayan Peoples' Liberation Army and the MCP. Between 1945 and 1948, tensions between the British and the MCP rose. As the British tried to repair the Malayan economy, the MCP, organized protests against labor conditions in the country. The protests became more effective, so the British responded with harsher measures. This in turn caused the protesters to become more militant, culminating in the beginning of organized violence with the assassination of three European plantation managers at Sungai Siput, Perak.

When the Emergency was declared in June 1948, the British were short of units with which to take on the Communists, especially units which were trained to fight in the jungle sanctuaries which the MCP and MNLA had established. As part of the solution, small counter-insurgency units to deal with jungle-based communist insurgency were formed. One of the units formed was Ferret Force.

== Formation ==
Lieutenant Colonel Walter Walker, GSO1 of Malaya District Headquarters, in Kuala Lumpur, sought permission to form a counter-insurgency unit to combat the MCP guerrillas. A veteran of the Burma Campaign, he sought to utilize the experience available from the recently demobilized Force 136. This unit would be known as Ferret Force.

Walker's new unit would operate in groups. Each group would typically be composed of four teams or sections. Each team would be composed of twelve soldiers, usually drawn from the Royal Malay Regiment or some other British or Gurkha regiment, a detachment from the Royal Signals, Dayak or Iban trackers from the Sarawak Rangers, and Chinese liaison officers. At its height, Ferret Force would grow to 16 operational sections.

== Operational history ==
Ferret Force became operational in July 1948. Operating in the jungle, the teams would typically rely on Dayak trackers to find communist camps. Once the camps were located, the rest of the team would be brought in to kill the guerillas. When guerrilla strongholds were not found, the Ferret Force teams would set up ambushes, waiting for guerrilla columns along suspected infiltration routes. The goal of the unit was not to defeat the MCP, but to spread fear by keeping the communists off balance.

Towards the end of its operational existence, Ferret Force took part in a large operation which were the type preferred by the British Army officers in theatre at the time. The Ferret Force teams were attached to British regular units, including 1 Devons, 1 Seaforths, 1 Inniskillings, 1/2 Gurkhas, and 1/10 Gurkhas. In the course of the large scale sweep, 12 camps were destroyed, 27 guerrillas were killed, and large amounts of matériel were seized. In contrast, a little more than a year later, British forces were to attempt a similar operation, but without the benefit of Ferret Force teams. The result was 1 kill, no caches discovered, and no surrenders of any MCP guerrillas.

Although the Ferret Force groups were successful against the MCP guerrillas, their greatest enemy was the British high command. There was much debate among the commanders favouring large unit actions to sweep and clear areas and those who preferred small unit tactics focusing on specific targets or persuading the communists to come over to the British side. Additionally, there was concern about the allegiance of some members of Ferret Force by the regular establishment of the British Army. Some of the Ferret Force members, because of their World War II work with Force 136, had ties with the MPAJA, the forerunner of their current enemy, and specifically with Chin Peng. In the end, Ferret Force was too unconventional for the Commander-in-Chief, British forces in the Far East, General Sir Neil Ritchie; Ferret Force was disbanded in December 1948.

== Legacy ==
Although Ferret Force existed for little more than six months, it had a large effect on British operations in Malaya. Despite General Ritchie being uncomfortable with the concept, he did grasp that the unit's ability to operate in the jungle was important, and the knowledge needed to be shared with the rest of the British Army in Malaya. Therefore, immediately after the disbandment of the Ferret Force sections, the personnel were used to establish the Far East Land Force Training Centre. Every unit deployed to the Malayan Emergency was required to send its NCOs and officers through the training at Force Training Centre, learning the procedures which Ferret Force had used during its six months of deep jungle patrolling.

How things got done is illustrated in the following extract from a War Office memo regarding Lieut. Q.M. Charles Gill of the Green Howards. He was "appointed as QM Force Ferret immediately following his arrival in Malaya from the United Kingdom. It was essential that this mixed force of civilian and military personnel, comprising five different nationalities, should be equipped and in the field in the shortest possible time. Although Lt Gill took over his duties on 12 July 1948 over 200 men, fully equipped and armed for jungle operations, had been deployed in their theatre of operations by the end of that month. Later the force increased to over 600 all ranks. Lt QM C. Gill was awarded the MBE.

Other members of Ferret Force would form the nucleus of A Squadron, Malayan Scouts in 1950 under Lieutenant Colonel Michael Calvert. The unit was part of the British realization that it needed a long range patrol unit to fight the guerrillas on its own terms, as part of the larger Briggs Plan of protecting the populace from the communist insurgency. In 1952, the Malayan Scouts would become part of the reformed 22nd Regiment, Special Air Service.
