= Maquis de Saint-Marcel =

Resistance fighter battalion during world war 2

Coordinates: 47.8050°N 2.4175°W

The Maquis de Saint-Marcel was a force of French resistance fighters, 3000 men with 200 Free French SAS (Special Air Service), during World War II operating in Brittany, Morbihan. It was created just before the Normandy landings with the objectives of preventing German army reinforcements from reaching the coast, thus facilitating the task of the allied landing forces.

The Maquis de Saint-Marcel lasted only a very short time. It had been infiltrated by German spies, allowing the Germans to attack it in an ambush on 18 June 1944. Around 2,400 Maquis and SAS were present and attacked by two companies of Germans, supported by mortars. Around noon the SAS requested and received support from British Royal Air Force fighter bombers and began to withdraw. The French lost 60 killed, 60 wounded and 15 captured and had to abandone a large cache of equipment that had been airdropped for them. The Germans, astonished by the resistance shown carried out reprisals against French civilians in the aftermath.

After it was dissolved, the remaining resistance fighters resumed contact without forming a new maquis.

== See also ==
- Paul Chenailler alias Colonel Morice
- Operation Dingson
- Operation Cooney
- Operation Lost
- Operation Samwest
