= Anne-Marie Trégouët =

- Born: Anne-Marie Francoise Perret; 23 February 1925; Loyat, Morbihan, France
- Died: 22 March 2024 (aged 99); Nantes, Loire-Atlantique, France
- Occupation: Veteran

Anne-Marie Trégouët (née Perret; 23 February 1925 – 22 March 2024) was a French veteran of World War II who was involved in the French Resistance.

She enlisted in Morbihan as a liaison agent in the French Forces of the Interior, took part in the Maquis de Saint-Marcel and was part of the Women's Auxiliaries of the Army.

== Biography ==
Anne-Marie Françoise Perret was born to farming parents in 1925 in the commune of Loyat in Brittany.

At the end of 1943, at the age of 19, she was recruited by the local French Resistance. The Sacré-Cœur high school in Ploërmel, where she was a teacher, was occupied by the Germans at the time, and her position at the school allowed her to observe their comings and goings. Her uncle, Ange Mounier, had also joined the Resistance.

On the night of the 5 June 1944, Special Air Service (SAS) commandos involved in Operation Dingson were deployed in Morbihan, in support of the Normandy landings which were taking place at the same time. These were sabotage actions and guerilla warfare against the German occupiers, in order to slow down the progress of German troops towards the Normandy front. The head of the French Forces of the Interior (FFI) in Morbihan, Paul Chenailler, organised the gathering of resistance fighters at the Nouette farm, near the village of Saint-Marcel, which had already been used for parachute operations. Anne-Marie Trégouët joined the Maquis de Saint-Marcel. She welcomed the parachutists and took part in various resistance actions: transmitting messages, supplying supplies, transporting grenades.

On 18 June, the maquis was discovered by a patrol of the Feldgendarmerie and fighting began. Anne-Marie Trégouët continued to serve as a liaison officer and rescued the wounded. After the SAS and FFI were forced to withdraw, she took refuge in a neighboring village and then continued to act in the vicinity of Ploërmel. Her 39-year-old uncle, Ange Mounier from Ploërmel was killed in Lézonnet, Loyat on 4 August during a clash between paratroopers and FFI against German soldiers.

The young teacher decided to leave her teaching position to enlist for a year in the Women's Auxiliaries of the Army (AFAT), a commitment that was poorly perceived at the time as women were still rare in the French army.

She received the Medal of Merit of the National Union of Combatants with "Gold" distinction. On 1 August 2020, the former resistance fighter was made a knight of the Legion of Honor in front of her family in Nantes.

She died on 22 March 2024 in Nantes at the age of 99. Her funeral took place three days later at the Sainte-Élisabeth church in Nantes and she was buried in the Taupont cemetery.

== Awards ==
- Knight of the Legion of Honor (January 1, 2020)
- Volunteer Combatant's Cross (1939–1945)
- Cross of the Resistance Volunteer Combatant
- Combatant's Cross
- Medal of the Nation's Gratitude
