= Special Air Service Troops =

- As evidenced by period photographs, members of the brigade wore the Pegasus insignia of the British airborne forces.
- Active: 1944-1945
- Country: United Kingdom
- Type: Paratrooper, special forces
- Role: Airborne forces, raiding, reconnaissance
- Size: Brigade
- Motto: Who Dares Wins

Insignia
- The insignia designed for the SAS in 1941

The Special Air Service Troops or SAS Brigade was a brigade-sized formation of the Special Air Service (SAS) which was founded on 7 January 1944 in the United Kingdom during the Second World War. The brigade was a multi-national force of British, French, and Belgian units. On formation, the brigade commanded the 1st and 2nd Special Air Service regiments, the French 2nd and 3rd Parachute Battalions (also known as the 3rd and 4th SAS Regiments), and the Belgian Parachute Company. In March 1944, F Squadron, GHQ Liaison Regiment was added to the brigade. In 1945, the Belgian parachute company was redesignated as 5th Special Air Service. The French units were also redesignated as the 2nd Parachute Chasseur Regiment and the 3rd Parachute Chasseur Regiment (abbreviated as 2 RCP and 3 RCP).

The brigade was initially commanded by Brigadier Roderick McLeod until 14 March 1945, when Brigadier Mike Calvert took command. The brigade was stationed in the United Kingdom until May 1945, then moved to Norway, returning to the United Kingdom in June for the duration of the war. Until April 1944, the brigade was assigned to Airborne Troops, before being placed under the command of the I Airborne Corps on 17 April for the duration of the war. The brigade's units took part in various operations as part of the Northwest Europe Campaign of 1944–1945, which included operations Amherst, Bulbasket, Cooney, Dingson, Houndsworth, Lost, Loyton, Kipling, Samwest, and Tombola.
