= Trégouët =

Trégouët may refer to:

- Anne-Marie Trégouët (1925–2024), French veteran
- Yann Trégouët (born 1975), French actor

== See also ==
- Tregonetha
