= Paul Chenailler =

Paul Chenailler (6 May 1904, Paris – 18 June 1960, Quéven), better known under the pseudonym Colonel Morice, was in charge of the French Resistance in the Morbihan region Brittany during World War II.

In 1940, at the beginning of the war, he was a "capitaine au long cours" and "lieutenant de vaisseau de réserve". After some reconnaissance missions at Le Havre, he relocated to Cherbourg, where he took command of the Marie-Gilberte and sailed from Casablanca in Morocco. In 1941, he was demobilised and relocated to the city. He immediately involved himself in the resistance, dealing with the general resupply of Morbihan. Chenailler took the name Colonel Morice after the arrest by the Germans of the commander Maurice Guillaudot, whose responsibilities he then assumed. As the regional commander of the Armée secrète, he assembled and organised different forces, and achieved the amalgamation of the Armée secrète and the Francs-tireurs et partisans into the Forces françaises de l'intérieur. He became commander of an army which would number as many as 12,000 fighters.

Throughout the winter of 1943-1944 Chenailler took delivery of numerous arms drops. From 6 June 1944, at the time of the Normandy landings the arms drops increased at Saint-Marcel, near Malestroit, and soldiers from the 4^{eme} bataillon d’Infanterie de l’Air (2^{eme} RCP / 4^{eme} SAS) were also parachuted in. On 18 June, the maquis de Saint-Marcel was attacked by the Germans, but the parachutists of the SAS and the maquis fighters succeeded in containing the attack and retaliating after nightfall. In August, after linking up with the Allied forces, Chenailler was at the front line at Lorient and at la Vilaine with general Borgnis-Desborde.

At the end of the war, Chenailler was promoted to the rank of Frigate captain, while still remaining lieutenant-colonel of the Armée de terre. He was the founder and director of the daily newspaper La Liberté du Morbihan, which had a circulation of 22,000 in 1954, and was distributed in Lorient at the surrounding area.

== Distinctions ==
- Officier de la Légion d'honneur
- Croix de la Libération
- Croix de Guerre 1939-1945
- Médaille de la Résistance
- Médaille commémorative 1939-1945
- Médaille commémorative des services volontaires dans la France libre
- Bronze Star
- Order of the British Empire
- Étoile Noire du Bénin

== Sources and Bibliography (French) ==
- Jean-Loup Avril, Mille Bretons, dictionnaire biographique, Éditions Les Portes du large, Saint-Jacques-de-la-Lande, 2002. ISBN 2-914612-10-9
- Roger Leroux, Le Morbihan en guerre (7^{e} édition), Ero, Éditions régionales de l’Ouest, Mayenne, 2000. ISBN 2-85554-042-9
- Jacqueline Sainclivier, La Bretagne de 1939 à nos jours, Éditions Ouest-France, Rennes, 1989, ISBN 2-7373-0488-1
