= Roderick McLeod (British Army officer) =

British Army officer

Lieutenant-General Sir Roderick McLeod GBE KCB
- Born: 15 January 1905
- Died: 6 December 1980 (aged 75)
- Military career
- Allegiance: United Kingdom
- Branch: British Army
- Service years: 1925−1965
- Rank: Lieutenant-General
- Service number: 31581
- Unit: Royal Artillery
- Commands: Eastern Command; Commander of British Forces in Hong Kong; 6th Armoured Division; Special Air Service Troops; 1st Airlanding Light Regiment
- Conflicts: North West Frontier; Second World War
- Awards: Knight Grand Cross of the Order of the British Empire; Knight Commander of the Order of the Bath; Mentioned in Despatches; Legion of Honour (France); Croix de Guerre (France); Order of Leopold II (Belgium)

Lieutenant-General Sir Roderick William McLeod, GBE, KCB (15 January 1905 – 6 December 1980) was a British Army officer who achieved high office in the 1950s.

== Military career ==
Educated at Wellington College and the Royal Military Academy, Woolwich, McLeod was commissioned into the Royal Artillery on 28 January 1925. He saw service during the Khajuri Plains operations on the North West Frontier of India between 1930 and 1932.

McLeod served in the Second World War and was commanding officer of the 1st Airlanding Light Regiment, Royal Artillery in North Africa and Sicily in 1943, moving on to be Deputy Commander 1st Parachute Brigade later that year. He was then made the first commander of the Special Air Service Brigade from 1944 to 1945.

After the war McLeod became Director of Military Operations in India from 1945 to 1947. He was appointed Assistant Commandant at the Staff College in 1948 and then Commander Royal Artillery for 7th Armoured Division, which was then part of British Army of the Rhine in 1950. He went on to be Director of Military Operations at the War Office in 1951 and then General Officer Commanding 6th Armoured Division in 1955. He was made Chief Army Instructor at the Imperial Defence College in 1957 and Deputy Chief of the Defence Staff at the Ministry of Defence later that year. He became Commander of British Forces in Hong Kong in 1960.

McLeod was also General Officer Commanding-in-Chief for Eastern Command from 1962; during his time at Eastern Command he chaired the McLeod Reorganisation of Army Logistics Committee which recommended re-organisation of the Logistic Services of the British Army: this led to the formation of the Royal Corps of Transport in 1965. He retired in 1965.

McLeod lived at Woking in Surrey and from 1966 to his death was Chairman of the Hockering Residents' Association.

== Family ==
In 1933 McLeod married Camilla Rachel Hunter Fell, who died in 1942. Then in 1946 he married Mary Vavasour Lloyd Thomas MBE, daughter of Dr Henry Lloyd Driver and his wife Amy Vavasour Berridge. She was the widow of Captain Henry Cecil Augustus Heyman, who died at Aldershot in 1935, and of Major Robert Jocelyn Henry Thomas MVO, killed in action at Tobruk in 1941. She was born in 1909 and died in 2000 in Surrey.

Military offices
Preceded by Francis Mitchell	GOC 6th Armoured Division; 1955–1957	Succeeded by Denis O'Connor
Preceded by Sir Edric Bastyan	Commander of British Forces in Hong Kong; 1960–1961	Succeeded by Sir Reginald Hewetson
Preceded by Sir Gerald Lathbury	GOC-in-C Eastern Command; 1962–1965	Succeeded by Sir George Cole
