= McLeod Reorganisation of Army Logistics =

The McLeod Reorganisation of Army Logistics was a major reorganisation of the British Army in the 1960s, principally affecting the Royal Engineers (RE), Royal Army Service Corps (RASC) and Royal Army Ordnance Corps (RAOC). Its principal outcome was the disbandment of the RASC and the creation of the Royal Corps of Transport (RCT). The committee was established at the direction of the Army Council in March 1963 and it was led by General Sir Roderick McLeod. The Committee worked quickly and its recommendations, with few exceptions, were officially notified to Parliament on 22 April 1964.

The principal outcomes of the committee were to rationalise transport to a newly formed RCT and rationalise many supply activities and ancillary logistic services to the RAOC.

== Background to reform ==
The logistic services of the Army had evolved over a long period as need arose and circumstances dictated. Up to the early 1960s there had been no major organisational change (excepting the creation of REME in 1942) since the closing years of the nineteenth century. Also the Army of the sixties was changing fast, national service had ended and the Army overall was becoming smaller, more mobile, technically complex and savings had to be found. Meeting these challenges was difficult where there was an overlap of functions. Transport and supply were two areas where reform was pressing.

== Transport ==
Transport related activity was divided between the Royal Engineer (Transportation Branch) (RE(Tn)) that operated movement control, port operation, inshore craft, pipelines and railways and the RASC that operated road vehicles, fixed wing liaison aircraft and seagoing vessels. It was agreed that the entire RE (Tn) organisation, less fuel farms (that went to RAOC) and railway and pipeline construction and maintenance (that remained RE responsibilities), should transfer to a newly formed RCT.

== Supply and ancillary services ==
Supply activity was principally divided between the RAOC (ammunition, vehicles, weapons and other equipment with their associated spares as well as clothing and general stores) and the RASC (fuels, rations and barrack stores). It was agreed that all the RASC ranges should be transferred to the RAOC.

There were four other supply systems that were left unchanged:

- The delivery of tanks and other crewed armoured vehicles on the battlefield (but not in peacetime where RAOC vehicle depots were used) - that remained the responsibility of the Royal Armoured Corps.
- A range of specialist equipment and associated spares (principally plant), defence stores and construction stores that remained the responsibility of Royal Engineers (Engineer Services) (RE (Engr Svcs).
- A range of specialist communications items that remained the responsibility of Royal Signals (R SIGNALS).
- A range of specialist items principally apothecary items and specialist hospital equipment that remained the responsibility of the Director General Army Medical Services (DGAMS).

In addition a range of other non-transport functions were transferred from RASC to RAOC. These were: control of the staff clerks, who provided clerical support in headquarters, the sponsorship of Navy Army and Air Force Institute (Expeditionary Force Institute) (NAAFI (EFI)), barrack services, including accommodation stores, and sponsorship of the Army Fire Service (AFS).

== Implementation ==
The report was implemented in three phases:

- Phase I: RAOC took over RASC functions allocated (achieved 1 July 1964).
- Phase II: RCT formed, RASC and RE(Tn) elements transferred (15 July 1964).
- Phase III: Existing depots absorbed and rationalised by RAOC (no set date but wide-ranging changes made)

Overall this substantial change went very smoothly and amicably.

An early recommendation was that staff clerks should be transferred to R SIGNALS but this was set aside as it was recognised that the staff clerks traditionally provided the principal cadre for commissioned barracks officers of the RASC that were being transferred to RAOC.

== A retrospective view ==
The McLeod report produced wide-ranging and sensible changes that were swiftly and efficiently implemented. However, by dividing supply and transport it created new interface problems in operations. The division of responsibility for combat supplies (ammunition, fuels and rations) on operations so that RAOC was responsible rear of the divisional rear boundary, with RCT responsible forward, began to become a major constraint as the predicted pace of battle quickened (especially in Central Europe) and systems such as the Demountable Rack Offload and Pickup System were introduced to reflect this new imperative.

Also leaving minor supply systems outside the RAOC probably delayed the introduction of an integrated supply system with its attendant efficiencies.

The creation of the Royal Logistic Corps in 1993 and the Defence Logistics Organisation in 2000 largely addressed these issues.
