= Operation Cooney =

WW2 SAS operation during the Normandy invasion

- Part of Normandy Landings
Date	8–10 June 1944
Location	Brittany, France
Result	Tactically indecisive Strategic Allied victory

Belligerents
Free French Forces	Germany

Operation Cooney was the deployment of elements of the 4ème Bataillon d'Infanterie de l'Air - the 4th Free French Parachute Battalion (later renamed 2ème Régiment de Chasseurs Parachutistes) - also known as 4th Special Air Service.

On 7 June 1944, the 9 aircraft of 38 Group (including two from No. 297 Squadron RAF), dropped the parachutists.

These men were to disrupt enemy communications between West Brittany and the remainder of France, and in all 58 Free French soldiers were dropped on no fewer than 18 undefended drop zones between St. Malo and Vannes. Their goal was to impair the German Army's response to the unfolding invasion of Normandy, Operation Overlord.

Breaking into 18 three-man or five-man SAS teams, the commandos scattered throughout Brittany destroying railroad targets. As a sign they had passed through they tied railroad ties around trees.

Some raiders then joined the base established by the Dingson team in Saint-Marcel, Morbihan or the base established by the Samwest team in Duault, Côtes d'Armor.

== Dramatization ==
- The Longest Day, a 1962 American film produced by Darryl F. Zanuck : 3 Free French SAS paratroopers, 1 woman (Janine Boitard) and 1 Resistance fighter against 2 german soldiers on the railroad near the bridge before the explosion.

== See also ==
- Operation Lost

== Notes ==
- Henry Corta (1921–1998), a Free French SAS lieutenant veteran, les bérets rouges (red berets), Paris, 1952, amicale des anciens parachutistes SAS,
- Henry Corta, Qui ose gagne (Who dares wins), Vincennes, 1997, service historique de l'armée de terre. ISBN 978-2-86323-103-6
