= Operation Samwest =

WW2 SAS operation during the Normandy invasion

- Part of Normandy Landings
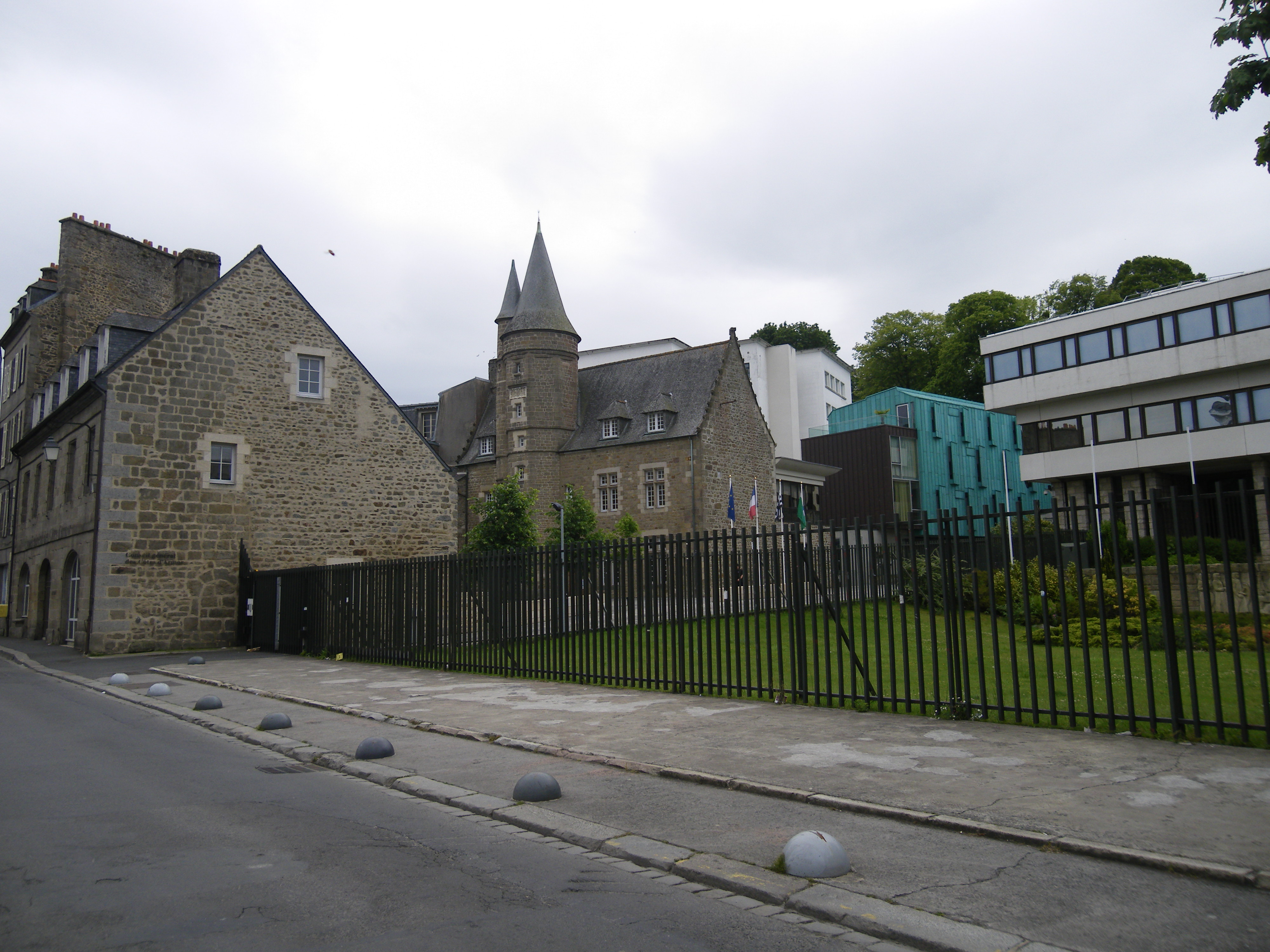
- Côtes-d'Armor, 9 June 2012
Date	5 to 12 June 1944
Location	Côtes-d'Armor, Northern Brittany, France
Result	German victory

Belligerents
Free French Forces 4th Special Air Service Regiment	Germany

Commanders and leaders
(Free France) Lieutenant Charles Deschamps (Free France) Lieutenant André Botella	unknown

Strength
18 paratroops	Unknown

Casualties and losses
Unknown	Unknown

During World War II, Operation Samwest (5–12 June 1944) was a large raid conducted by 116 Free French paratroops of the 4th Special Air Service Regiment. Their objective was to hinder movement of German troops from west Brittany to the Normandy beaches via ambush and sabotage attempts.

The first phase of the mission was to establish a secure base on the Breton Peninsula, near Saint-Brieuc in Duault in the Bretagne Region. Their base was heavily attacked by German troops on 12 June and they were forced to disperse.

== See also ==
- Operation Dingson
- Operation Cooney
- Operation Lost
