= Operation Dingson =

SAS operation during WW2

- Part of Normandy Landings
Date	5 to 18 June 1944
Location	Southern Brittany, France
Result	Tactically indecisive Strategic Allied victory

Belligerents
(Free France) French Resistance; Free French Forces	Germany

Operation Dingson (5–18 June 1944) was an operation in the Second World War, conducted by 178 Free French paratroops of the 4th Special Air Service (SAS), commanded by Colonel Pierre-Louis Bourgoin, who jumped into German occupied France near Vannes, Morbihan, southern Brittany, in Plumelec, on the night of 5 June 1944 with Captain Pierre Marienne and 17 men, then advanced to Saint-Marcel (8–18 June).

At this time, there were approximately 100,000 German troops and artillery preparing to move to the Normandy landing areas.

Immediately upon landing in Brittany, at 11:30 on the night of 5 June 1944, the Free French SAS who jumped near Plumelec went into action fighting against German troops (actually Georgians and Ukrainians).

One hour later at 0:40 am, Corporal Émile Bouétard (born 1915 in Brittany) was killed near Plumelec, becoming the first casualty of the liberation of his country.

The Free French SAS established a base at Saint-Marcel and began to arm and equip members of local French Resistance, operating with up to 3,000 Maquis fighters and 200 paratroopers. However, their base was heavily attacked by a German paratroop division on 18 June, and they were forced to disperse.

A few weeks later, Captain Pierre Marienne and 17 of his companions (six paratroopers, eight Resistance fighters and three farmers) were summarily executed after being captured in Kerihuel, Plumelec at dawn on 12 July.

The Dingson team was joined by the men who had just completed Operation Cooney. Dingson was conducted alongside Operation Samwest and Operation Lost.

== Operation Dingson 35A ==
On 5 August 1944, 10 Waco CG-4 gliders towed by aircraft of 298 Squadron and 644 Squadron transported the French SAS men and armed jeeps to Brittany near Vannes (Locoal-Mendon), each glider carrying 3 SAS troopers and a jeep which carried two Vickers K machine guns plus explosives, sten guns and a PIAT antitank gun. The gliders were escorted by 32 Spitfires for part of the trip. One glider was lost with the death of the British pilot.

The SAS teams remained behind enemy lines in occupied territory until the Allies arrived. The glider pilots were looked after by the local Resistance and then met up with the advancing American army at Auray.

== Notes ==
- Henry Corta (1921–1998), a Free French SAS lieutenant veteran, les bérets rouges (red berets), Paris, 1952, amicale des anciens parachutistes SAS,
- Henry Corta, Qui ose gagne (Who dares wins), Vincennes, 1997, service historique de l'armée de terre. ISBN 978-2-86323-103-6
