= 27th Engineer Battalion (United States) =

United States Army engineer battalion

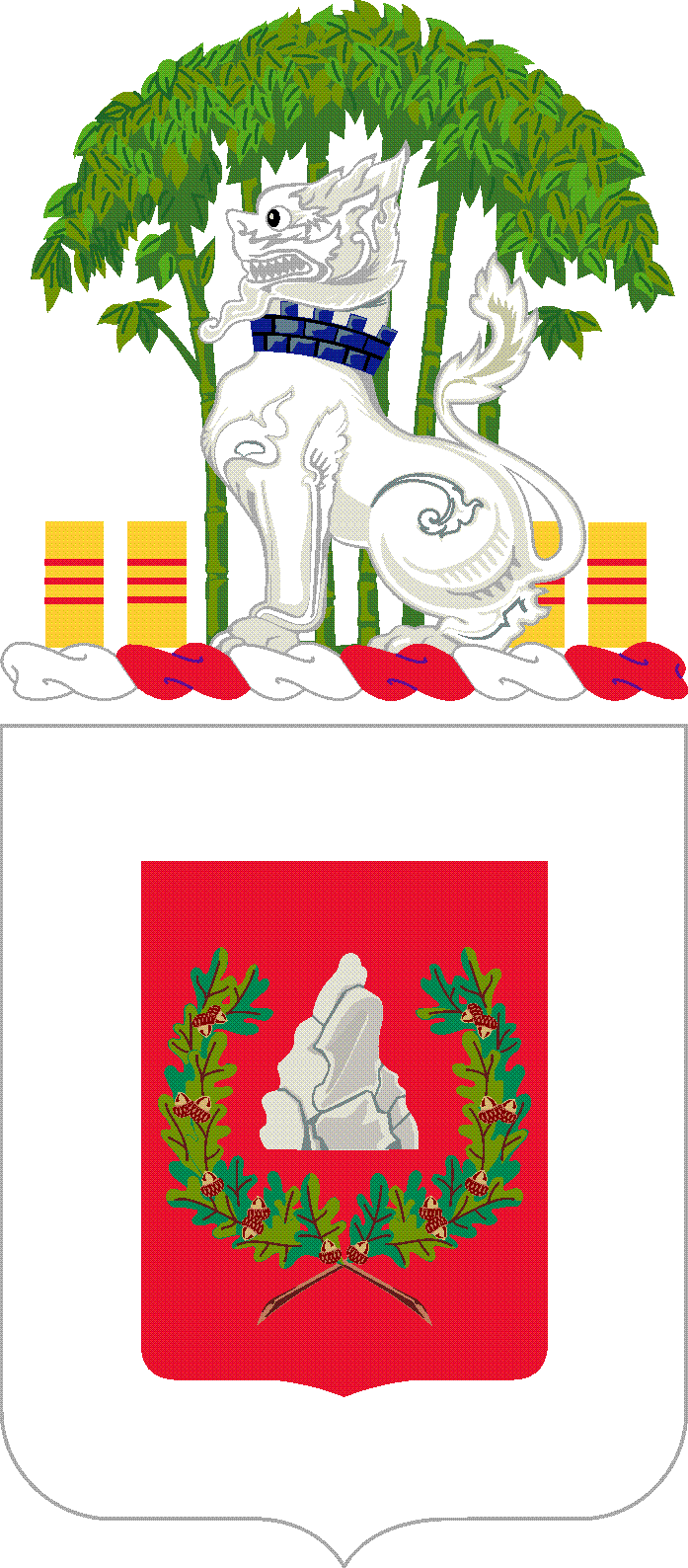
- 27th Engineer Battalion coat of arms
- Active: 1918–present
- Country: United States
- Branch: US Army Corps of Engineers
- Type: Engineer
- Role: Forced Entry Expeditionary Engineering
- Size: Battalion
- Part of: 20th Engineer Brigade
- Garrison/HQ: Fort Bragg
- Nickname: Tiger Battalion
- Mottos: Omnes Res Bene Facere (To Do All Things Well)
- Mascot: Tiger

Insignia
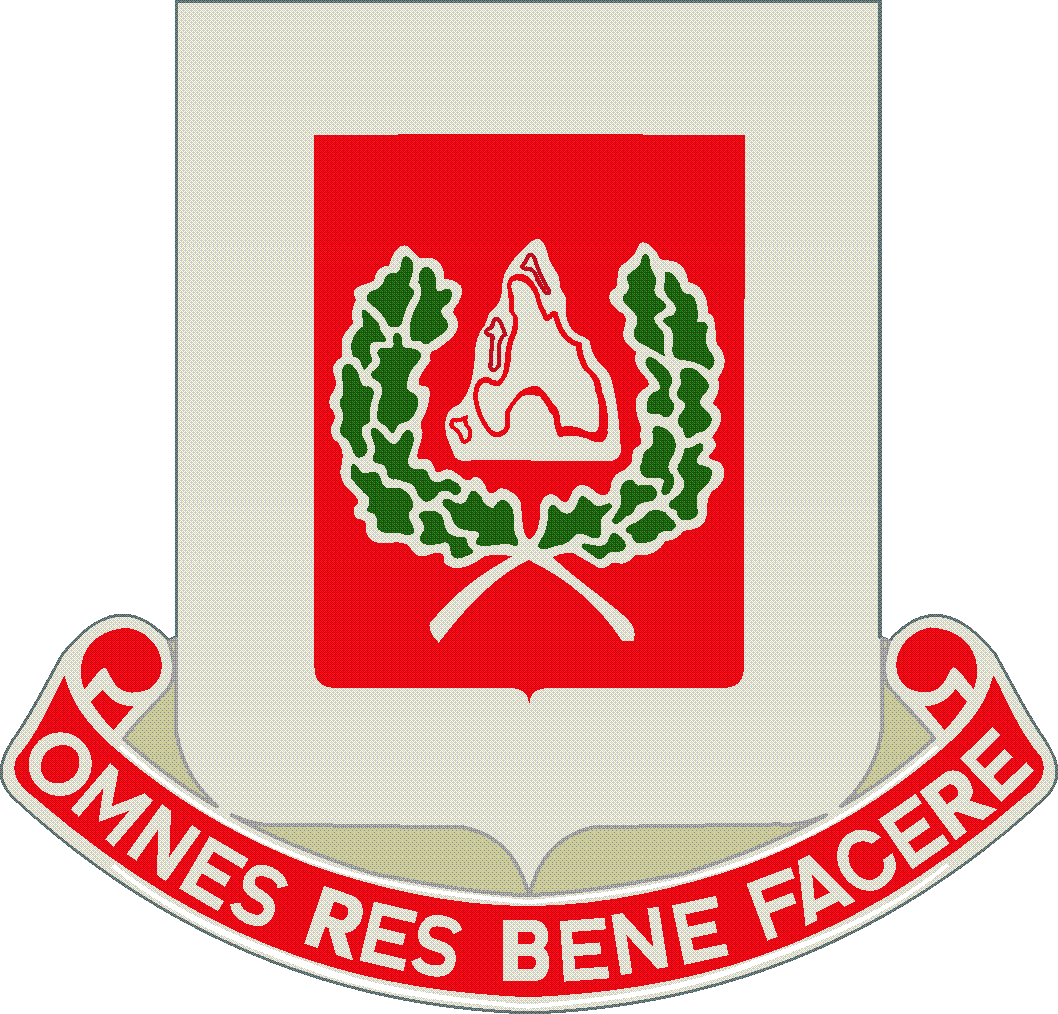
- Distinctive unit insignia

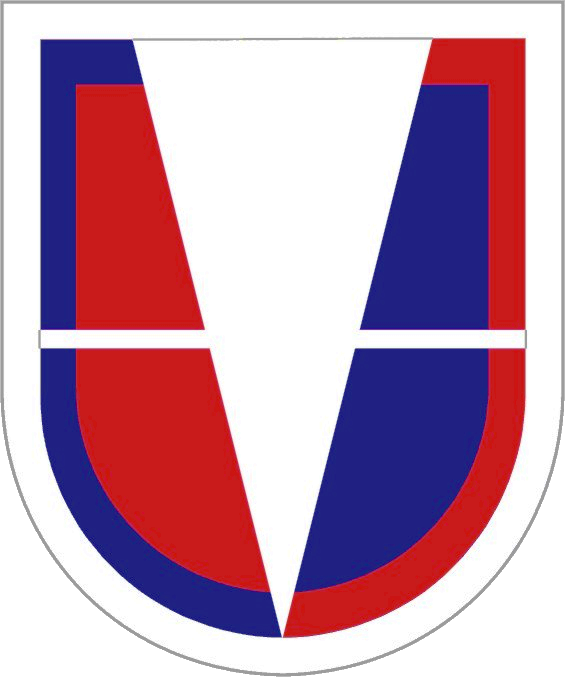
- Unit beret flash

The 27th Engineer Battalion (Combat) (Airborne) "Tiger Battalion" is an engineer battalion of the United States Army.

== History ==
The 27th Engineer Battalion was established on January 16, 1918 at Fort Myer, Virginia as the 2D Battalion, 37th Engineer Regiment. In July 1918, during World War I, the unit fought in the Battle of Saint-Mihiel and Meuse-Argonne; the unit was demobilized afterwards at Camp Upton. It was reconstituted in the Regular Army as the 2nd Battalion, 37th Engineers in October 1933, then reactivated on July 14, 1941 at Camp Bowie and assigned to the VIII Corps. The unit was moved to Camp Edwards in 1942 and redesignated as the 2nd Battalion, 37th Engineer Combat Regiment. They were assigned to the VII Corps later that year and moved to Camp Beale. The March 1943 redesignation renamed the HHC as the 1106th Engineer Combat Group; the 1st Battalion as the 37th Engineer Combat Battalion; and the 2nd Battalion as the 209th Engineer Combat Battalion.

The unit was deployed from the New York Port of Embarkation in September 1943 and arrived in Bombay in October, where they joined the India-Burma Campaign. While attached to the 5307th Composite Unit, they helped seize the Myitkyina airfield during the Siege of Myitkyina. Seventy-one members of the 209th were killed in action and 179 wounded during the 70-day-long battle. In 1945, they participated in the Central Burma Campaign before being moved to Ledo Road with the exception of Company A, who remained in Myitkyina. They returned to the United States in November 1945 where they were inactivated at Camp Kilmer. In 1947, they were redesignated as the 27th Engineering Combat Battalion. They earned a Presidential Unit Citation for their work at the airfield. They were activated for one month while at Ft. Lewis in 1950. They activated in March 1951 at Ft. Campbell and redesignated in June 1953 as the 27th Engineer Battalion. In October 1960, the unit earned the nickname "Tiger Battalion" due to its rugged field manueuvers and training.

They entered the Vietnam War in 1966 and arrived in Bien Hoa that October. They were later based in Xuan Loc with the 79th Engineer Group. They came under the jurisdiction of the 34th Engineer Group in April 1967 and were transferred in April 1968 to support the 45th Engineer Group in Gia Le and the 101st Airborne Division at Camp Eagle. They returned to the United States on January 31, 1972 and settled at Ft. Campbell. The unit received five Meritorious Unit Commendations for action in Vietnam and one for action in Southwest Asia, the Superior Unit Award for AHAUS TAURA '90, and the Civil Action Honor Medal (1st class) with 19 campaign streamers for their efforts. They later moved to Fort Bragg, where the unit became a non-divisional combat airborne engineer battalion. Parts of the unit took part in Operation Bright Star 82 and were deployed to Berbera. While in Somalia, the 27th carried out infrastructural improvement projects for the Somali people. That summer, they provided relief support following Hurricane Agnes, including potable water from purification platoons.

In 1983, the 27th repaired runways after Cuban engineers damaged them with explosives during the Invasion of Grenada. During Operation Desert Shield, while attached to France's 6th Light Armoured Division, they became the lead engineer battalion for the XVIII Airborne Corps. They returned to Fort Bragg in 1991 and created a small memorial to its Desert Storm veterans. The unit was deployed again a year and a half later to Miami-Dade County, Florida for Hurricane Andrew relief efforts. They remained there as part of the Task Force All-American for a year. From September to November 1994, they worked with the 10th Mountain Division (Light) to establish Base Camp Dragon and Castle in Haiti following Operation Uphold Democracy. While there, they constructed a school which was subsequently damaged by Hurricane Bonnie. Security detail was also posted at their compound.

In November 2001, they joined Operations Joint Guardian. Since the beginning of the war on terror, they have worked on several projects in Iraq and Afghanistan. In March 2003, the Light Equipment Platoon from Bravo Company (Rough Terrain), augmented with a squad of combat engineers, was attached to the 3rd Battalion, 75th Ranger Regiment for the invasion of Iraq in support of Operation Iraqi Freedom. Members of Bravo Company conducted a combat airborne operation onto H-1 Airfield, west of Ramadi, Iraq, on March 28, 2003. The unit cleared the airfield of dirt piles, trucks, tanks, and other debris, enabling the forward movement of Special Operations units for the attack on Baghdad. In January 2003, the 27th's Company C became the first counter-mine company in the Army since the Vietnam War. They used both mechanical clearance equipment and modern mine detectors to clear hundreds of thousands of square meters of land mines and other explosives at Bagram Airfield so the airfield could expand. The soldiers have received decorations such as the Silver Star and Soldier's Medal in addition to unit citations. The company received two Meritorious Unit Commendations for its actions in Afghanistan.

All lettered companies of the 27th were inactivated at Ft. Campbell in October 2008 before being deployed to Afghanistan in December 2009 where they worked on route clearance duty, responsible for clearing roadside bombs and other improvised explosive devices planted by insurgents. The battalion was given a Meritorious Unit Commendation for their service. As of October 1999, they had the last and only airborne well driller detachment/platoon left in the United States Army. As of 2014, the 27th's 57th Sapper Company is the only company in the Army that specializes in rough terrain airborne insertion. In addition to their field action, the HHC 27th Engineer Battalion has built a mock kill house for urban actions training; renovated their company's offices; built a FSC company area; erected a rappel tower at a high school in North Carolina; and extended a runway at a municipal airport in North Carolina.

== Organizational structure ==
XVIII Airborne Corps

- 20th Engineer Brigade
  - Headquarters and Headquarters Company, 20th Engineer Brigade
  - 19th Engineer Battalion (Construction Effects)
  - 27th Engineer Battalion (Combat)(Airborne)
    - Headquarters and Headquarters Company, 27th Engineer Battalion
    - Forward Support Company, 27th Engineer Battalion
    - 57th Sapper Company (Combat)(Airborne)(Rough Terrain)
    - 133rd Engineer Detachment
    - 161st Engineer Support Company (Airborne)
    - 264th Engineer Clearance Company
    - 513th Fire Fighting Detachment
  - 92nd Engineer Battalion

== Insignia ==
The unit's insignia is a silver-colored metal and enamel device 1 1/8 inches (2.9 cm) tall. It has a shield and gules, a rock argent, within the garland of oak leaves. Below the insignia is a red scroll with the unit's motto, "Omnes res bene facere" (To Do All Things Well), in silver letters. The shield is red in reference to engineers. The rock was taken from the Arms of Saint-Mihiel and the oak leaves from Meuse-Argonne; both of these areas were where the unit served during World War I. The insignia's border indicates the descent of the 209th Engineer Battalion from the 37th Engineer Regiment. The insignia was approved in March 1951 and redesignated for combat in July 1955 and again in February 1972.

Similarly, the unit's coat of arms has a gules shown within an oak leaf garland with acorns. A chinthe appears sejant with an azure mural crown around its neck. A bamboo grove appears in the background and arches above the chinthe. The base is between four billets, each charged with three barrulets of the second. The chinthe references the chinthe on the Burmese State Seal; the blue of the mural crown represents the heavily fortified town of Myitkyina, where the unit worked during World War II. Blue is also the color of the Presidential Unit Citation (Army) streamer, which they were awarded for their work. The bamboo grove refers to the emblem of Vietnam as a nod to the work the unit did during the Vietnam War. The yellow and red billets refer to the five Vietnam decorations received by the unit: the four Meritorious Unit Commendations and the Civil Actions Medal. The coat of arms was approved in February 1945 and redesignated in both March 1951 and July 1955. It was redesignated again and amended to add a crest in November 1973.

== Honors ==
=== Campaign participation credit ===
- World War I:
1. Saint-Mihiel;
2. Meuse-Argonne
- World War II:
1. India-Burma;
2. Central Burma
- Vietnam:
1. Counteroffensive, Phase II;
2. Counteroffensive, Phase III;
3. Tet Counteroffensive;
4. Counteroffensive, Phase IV;
5. Counteroffensive, Phase V;
6. Counteroffensive, Phase VI;
7. Tet 69/Counteroffensive;
8. Summer-Fall 1969;
9. Winter-Spring 1970;
10. Sanctuary Counteroffensive;
11. Counteroffensive, Phase VII;
12. Consolidation I;
13. Consolidation II
- Southwest Asia:
1. Defense of Saudi Arabia;
2. Liberation
3. Defense of Kuwait
4. Operation Enduring Freedom

=== Decorations ===
- Presidential Unit Citation (Army) for
1. MYITKYINA
- Meritorious Unit Commendation (Army) for
1. VIETNAM 1966–1967
2. VIETNAM 1967–1968
3. VIETNAM 1968–1969
4. VIETNAM 1969
5. VIETNAM 1970–1971
6. SOUTHWEST ASIA
7. AFGHANISTAN 2004
8. AFGHANISTAN 2009–2010
- Army Superior Unit Award for
1. Hurricane Andrew Relief 1990
- Republic of Vietnam Civil Action Honor Medal, First Class for
1. VIETNAM 1967–1968
