= Operation Begonia =

1943 British airborne operation in Italy

During World War II, Operation Begonia was the airborne counterpart to the amphibious Operation Jonquil, conducted by British SAS and Eighth Army Airborne between Ancona and Pescara, Italy, from 2–6 October 1943. The operational force comprised 61 men.

== Objective ==
The object was to locate escaped POWs in the interior and muster them on beach locations for extraction. Begonia involved the interior parachute drop by four parties of Airborne and one party of 2 SAS. Jonquil entailed four seaborne beach parties from 2 SAS with the French SAS Squadron as protection.

== Outcome ==
Faults in planning and the omission of radios resulted in hundreds of POWs being located and forwarded to the beaches, but only 50 meeting with the beach parties and being evacuated.
