= Treejumping =

Parachuting into a forest or jungle

Treejumping is a form of parachuting, into a forest or jungle – typically, from a relatively low altitude. It is generally considered to be a particularly dangerous form of parachuting. Treejumping is also especially damaging to the parachuting equipment.

The technique was pioneered by the British Special Air Service Regiment in 1951 during the Malayan Emergency, when insertion into dense jungle was required to combat the insurgents of the Malayan National Liberation Army. Soldiers carried a 30-metre rope to enable them to abseil down from the forest canopy.

In the United States Army, there is one company of combat engineers, Bravo Company of the 27th Engineer Battalion (Combat)(Airborne), trained to intentionally jump into forested areas in order to create drop zones for follow-on forces. In 2008, the 27th Engineer Battalion (Combat)(Airborne) transformed, changing Bravo Company (Combat)(Airborne)(Rough Terrain) to the 57th Engineer Company (Airborne)(Sapper)(Rough Terrain).

== Recent Rough Terrain Operations ==
On October 27, 2011, 37 Soldiers from the 57th EN CO exited a C-23 Sherpa over Luzon Tree Drop Zone, located in Fort Bragg, NC. Three Soldiers from the 161st Engineer Support Company also participated in the jump. The 161st ESC also supported the Rough Terrain operation by providing a large detail to recover parachutes stuck amongst the trees. CPT Benjamin Shean, Commander of the 57th EN CO, performed duties as the Airborne Commander and primary jumpmaster on the first and fourth pass.

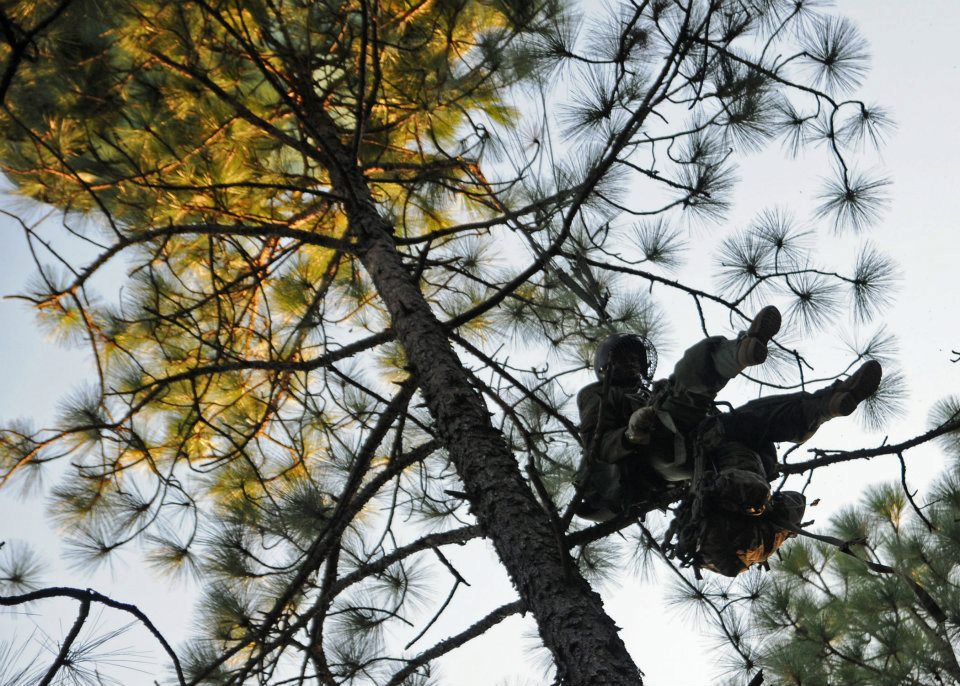
A Rough Terrain Paratrooper from the 57th Engineer Company finds himself suspended from the trees. To reach the ground, he must rappel from a letdown line tied into his parachute risers.

Most paratroopers landed within the boundaries of the drop zone and assembled in the South East corner of Luzon Tree Drop Zone. Numerous soldiers who landed in the trees found themselves suspended up to 40 feet above the ground. These soldiers rappelled to the ground by securing a letdown line to the risers of their MC1-1 steerable parachute.

The Rough Terrain operation on 27 October was the first such operation conducted by the 57th Engineer Company since 2009. The purpose and intent of the Rough Terrain operation was to demonstrate the ability to land in a tree drop zone, and the proficiency to do so safely. The 57th Engineer Company is planning multiple Rough Terrain operations in 2012 in order to build proficiency, certify more soldiers as Rough Terrain, and continue to train the full spectrum of Rough Terrain operations. Training for the Rough Terrain operation was conducted at the United States Army Advanced Airborne School in September, 2011.
