= Green beret (disambiguation) =

The green beret was the headgear of the British Commandos of World War II.

Green Berets may also refer to:

== Military ==
- The green beret was the official headdress of the British Commandos of the Second World War.
- Green Berets, a nickname of United States Army Special Forces
- Green Berets, the Portuguese Paratroopers
- Green beret, a colour of military beret (and a list of forces with green berets)
- Green Berets, Zelene beretke, a paramilitary organization founded in Sarajevo, Republic of Bosnia and Herzegovina in early 1992
- Green berets, nickname for the Iranian 65th Airborne Special Forces Brigade soldiers

== Arts and entertainment ==
- The Green Berets (book), a 1965 book by Robin Moore
  - The Green Berets (film), the 1968 film version of Moore's book starring John Wayne
- The Green Beret (animation), a 1992 animated short film by Stephen Hillenburg
- Green Beret (video game), also known as Rush'n Attack, a 1985 video game

== See also ==
- Green hat (disambiguation)
- Green Berets in popular culture
- "The Ballad of the Green Berets", a 1966 American patriotic song in the ballad style
- Tales of the Green Beret, a daily comic strip and American comic book
