= Jane Hancox Newell Moore =

- Born: Jane Hancox Newell; June 17, 1857; Cambridge, Massachusetts
- Died: August 14, 1945 (aged 88)
- Spouse: James Lowell Moore
- Children: 2
- Scientific career
- Fields: Botany

Jane Hancox Newell Moore (17 June 1857 - 14 August 1945) was an American botanist and author. She is known for her publications on botany for children. She was the mother of Robert Lowell Moore and the grandmother of Robin Moore and Marcia Moore.

== Life and career ==
Newell was born Jane Hancox Newell on 17 June 1857 in Cambridge, Massachusetts to Reverend William Newell and Frances Boott Wells. Her father had graduated from Harvard College in 1824, and he subsequently served as the Unitarian minister at the First Church of Roxbury and the First Church of Cambridge. Her mother was a descendent of the minister William Wells. Newell had five siblings who lived to adulthood: Frances "Fanny" Boott Newell, William Wells Newell, Robert Ralston Newell, Kirk Boott Newell, and Louisa Lee Newell.

In the late nineteenth century, botany was a common area of study for women. New England was a particularly strong locus for female botanists due to the early establishment of female academies and women's colleges. Although women frequently studied botany, publishing original research on the topic was rare. More commonly, women who published works on botany wrote textbooks directed towards schools and children.

Newell wrote at least three books on botany directed towards young children and authored an original research article on the flowers of the horsechestnut. She was primarily active scientifically from 1888 to 1898.

Newell married James Lowell Moore on 2 February 1895. Together they had two sons: Robert Lowell Moore, who was born on 12 January 1896, and Arthur Moore who was born around 1898. Robert Moore went on to co-found the Sheraton Hotels and Resorts. Robert Moore also had five children, including author Robin Moore and writer and astrologer Marcia Moore.

== Publications ==
- Newell, Jane H. (1888). Outlines of Lessons in Botany: For the Use of Teachers, or Mothers Studying with their Children. Part I: From Seed to Leaf. Illustrated by H. P. Symmes.
- Newell, Jane H. (1892). Outlines of Lessons in Botany: For the Use of Teachers, or Mothers Studying with their Children. Part II: Flower & Fruit. Illustrated by H. P. Symmes. Boston: Ginn & Company.
- Moore, Jane Newell (1893). "The Flowers of the Horsechestnut". Botanical Gazette. 18 (3): 107–109. doi:10.1086/326906.
- Moore, Jane Newell (1896). "Morning in Venice". In Merrill, Estelle M. H. (ed.). Cambridge Sketches by Cambridge Authors. Cambridge, Massachusetts: Cambridge Young Women's Christian Association. p. 174.
- Moore, Jane Newell (1898). A reader in botany. Vol. 1. Ginn & Co.
