= Marcia Moore =

American astrological writer

- Marcia Moore in 1956
- Born: Marcia Sheldon Moore; May 22, 1928; Cambridge, Massachusetts, U.S.
- Died: January 14, 1979 (aged 50); Washington, U.S.
- Occupations: Writer, astrologer, yoga teacher
- Known for: Mysterious disappearance and death

Marcia Moore (May 22, 1928 – January 14, 1979 (Note: Date of her disappearance and — presumably — her death.)) was an American writer, astrologer and yoga teacher brought to national attention in 1965 through Jess Stearn's book Yoga, Youth, and Reincarnation. She was an advocate and researcher of the dissociative properties of the drug ketamine. Moore disappeared in 1979, and although her remains were found in 1981, the cause and circumstances of her death are still unknown.

== Biography ==
=== Early life ===
Moore was born Marcia (pronounced mar-SEE-uh) Sheldon Moore, in Cambridge, Massachusetts on May 22, 1928, the only daughter of Robert L. Moore, founder of the Sheraton Hotel chain, and Eleanor Turner Moore, who was an artist, illustrator and esotericist. She had three brothers: writer Robert (Robin) Moore, John S. Moore, and William K. Moore. Robin Moore wrote The Green Berets (1965) and The French Connection (1969) among other books.

In 1947 she married Simons L. Roof, an aspiring writer, and in 1950 the couple moved from Cambridge to Concord. They had three children. In 1955, the family left for an extended trip to India, where they studied Hindu and esoteric religions. They returned to the United States in the fall of 1957.

Moore finished her studies at Radcliffe College in 1960. Her senior thesis was published under the title Astrology Today: A Socio-Psychological Survey.

=== Drug proponent ===
With her anesthesiologist husband Howard Alltounian, she became a proponent of the drug ketamine and published Journeys Into The Bright World in 1978. The book promoted the existential richness of the ketamine-induced dissociative experience, and the possibilities for using this drug in conjunction with Jungian psychotherapy.

=== Disappearance and death ===
In the winter of 1979, at age 50, Moore disappeared. Her remains were found two years later in the woods near her Washington home. It has been hypothesized that on a winter night in the forest, Moore had injected all the ketamine available to her, became unconscious, and died of hypothermia. Her lower jaw was identified via dental records. Writer Ann Rule stated that Moore's skull had been found with a hole in it; one of her friends suspected it was a bullet hole, but investigators believed it may have happened due to the skull's exposure to the elements over two years. This information was not immediately published by investigators at the time of the discovery. The cause of her death remains unresolved.

Joseph and Marina DiSomma re-examined the details of Moore's case in a 2021 book and alleged that she was murdered by Alltounian. At the time, he had told police that they had an “idyllic” relationship and she was suicidal, but her friends dispute these claims. Alltounian was unemployed and financially dependent on Moore, who paid his alimony. Moore's friend Maria claimed that a few months before her death, she had told her that she wanted to stop doing ketamine and felt she "had to get away" from Alltounian. Moore's neighbor observed that they had not spent Christmas together, and several friends reported they had a bad fight the night before she disappeared. Several days after her disappearance, Alltounian produced a typed note that he claimed he saw Moore write, requesting that all the money in her trusts be transferred to him.

The DiSommas interviewed Alltounian's girlfriend Shelley, who he dated after Moore:

“the one thing Shelley was certain of was that Howard admitted to pumping Marcia full of ketamine. “She was going out, and I kept popping it up,” he told her about the dosage. He injected more and more until he killed her, he purportedly admitted. Then he took her body to a nearby field, “some kind of farmland thing.” There he dumped her in a shallow grave, “and I knew the animals would eat her up,” he said.”

Alltounian died of heart failure in 2006.

== Personal life ==
Moore married four times. Her first husband was Simons Roof, with whom she had three children, Louisa (Loulie) in 1948, Christopher in 1951, and Jonathan (Jonny) in 1953. The couple divorced in 1961, and she married Louis S. Acker in 1962. She later married Mark Douglas and moved to Maine, where the couple published a series of books on yoga. In the late 1970s, she married Howard Alltounian, M.D. (1937–2006) and they moved to Washington, near Seattle.

== Legacy ==
Moore's personal papers, the Marcia S. Moore Collection, 1948–1999 (Bulk 1948–1964), were given to Concord Library by her son Christopher Roof in May 2009. Christopher also died mysteriously. His body was found by a hunter in the woods of Maine on November 4, 2010, and was not identified until September 20, 2021. The circumstances around and cause of his death are still unknown.

== Publications ==
- Reincarnation, the Key to Immortality, with Mark Douglas, Able Trust edition, ISBN 978-0-912240-02-2, 1968.
- Diet, Sex and Yoga, with Mark Douglas, Able Trust edition, ISBN 978-0-912240-00-8, 1970.
- Astrology in Action, with Mark Douglas, Able Trust edition, ISBN 978-0-912240-03-9, 1970.
- Hypersentience: Exploring Your Past Lifetime As a Guide to Your Character and Destiny, ISBN 0-517-52536-4, 1976.
- Journeys into the Bright World, Para Research Inc, ISBN 978-0-914918-12-7, 1978.
- Astrology: The Divine Science, Able Trust edition, ISBN 978-0-912240-04-6, 1978.
- Yoga, Science of the Self, with Mark Douglas, Arcane Publications York Harbor, ASIN: B0006X5POC, 1979.

== See also ==
- John C. Lilly
- D. M. Turner
- List of solved missing person cases
- List of unsolved deaths
