= United States Army Special Forces in popular culture =

Media representations of the Green Berets

Since their creation in 1952, the U.S. Army Special Forces (including the "Green Berets") have appeared in a wide variety of popular culture referents. After a decline in popularity during the 1970s — coinciding with the American public's backlash against the Vietnam War — the Green Berets notably gripped the popular imagination with the Rambo film franchise in 1982. They continued to appear in popular culture, in particular as a dramatic device in various types of fictions.

== Background ==
Although the U.S. Army Special Forces were created with a low profile in 1952, and the green beret was not officially authorized, things changed with President John F. Kennedy. He wanted to challenge Communist influence and wars of liberation in the recently decolonized Third World, and bolster pro-American regimes with the U.S. Army's own special forces and counter-guerrilla fighters.

On 12 October 1961, Kennedy visited the U.S. Special Warfare Center, where his aide, Major General Chester V. Clifton (and friend of the SWC Commander, BG William P. Yarborough) informed Yarborough that the President was keen on the Special Forces — but would not visit the SF base unless they were wearing their green berets. The Army, having previously forbidden the green beret, allowed the soldiers to wear them, lest JFK not visit.

== In literature ==
In the 1960s, the public was fascinated with the type of soldier of the New Frontier, and the Army reluctantly gave journalists' access to many of Special Forces often top secret missions. One writer was Robin Moore, who used his connections with Harvard University classmate Robert F. Kennedy to write a book about the Special Forces. The U.S. Army agreed on the condition that Moore (then 38 years old) complete the Basic Airborne Course and SF training before being allowed to visit the Special Forces in South Vietnam.

1966 Fightin' Army comic book, published by Charlton Comics.

Robin Moore successfully completed the courses and was allowed to live with the soldiers in Special Forces and their South Vietnamese, Montagnard, and Nung allies. His book, The Green Berets, was published in 1965, but, because he mentions the American presence in North Vietnam and Cambodia, he published The Green Berets as a novel. The U.S. Army was upset by the book; the reading public was not and it became a best selling book, especially its paperback edition in 1966. Robin Moore also wrote a 1965 Tales of the Green Beret newspaper comic strip with artwork by Sgt. Rock Joe Kubert that was also published in paperback. It later became a Dell Publishing American comic book in 1967 replacing their earlier Jungle War Stories and Guerrilla War comics. When DC Comics's Larry Rock (brother of the Sergeant), the replacement in Our Fighting Forces for the Marines Gunner and Sarge and their dog Pooch proved unpopular, DC replaced him with a Green Beret named Captain Hunter in 1966. Captain Hunter's adventures featured him hunting for his twin brother, a pilot shot down and captured by the Viet Cong. Other war comics put in their own Green Beret characters, such as Lightning Comics' Todd Holton-Super Green Beret (1967).

=== List of books portraying US Army Special Forces ===
- 2009: Horse Soldiers: The Extraordinary Story of a Band of U.S. Soldiers Who Rode to Victory in Afghanistan, by Doug Stanton; adapted into the 2018 film, 12 Strong.

=== List of comics ===
- The father of the Modern Age Batwoman, Colonel Jacob Kane, is a Green Beret, specifically from the 3rd Special Forces Group. After Kate Kane is discharged from West Point under Don't Ask Don't Tell, a chance encounter with Batman inspires her to take up the role of a masked vigilante in Gotham City. Jacob Kane uses his connections within the special operations community to have his daughter trained around the globe, after which she takes up the Batwoman mantle. Notably, prior to becoming a vigilante, Kate gets a tattoo of the Green Beret sleeve insignia on her shoulder in memory of her mother Gabrielle, who had a similar tattoo.

== Songs ==
At the time of Moore's book and the increasing U.S. Military involvement in the Vietnam War, Special Forces Staff Sergeant Barry Sadler wrote a song with Robin Moore and recorded it under the title "The Ballad of the Green Berets", which became the number-one single of 1966 in the U.S. In addition to the single, Sadler released an album Ballads of the Green Berets with Sadler's photograph of him in a green beret appearing on the single, the LP, and on the paperback cover of Moore's The Green Berets. SSgt. Sadler later recorded an additional, but lesser, song "The A-Team" and released two more long-playing albums, then wrote his autobiography, I'm a Lucky One.

"The Ballad of the Green Berets" had many cover versions ranging from Ennio Morricone and Duane Eddy to "drugstore records" on labels such as Diplomat and Wyncote records. Hanna-Barbera Records released a children's LP The Story of the Green Beret available to members of the G.I. Joe club. The album was a tie-in with the release of the G.I. Joe Green Beret action figure that had appeared in 1966. The record had an album cover of Special Forces in action and a picture of the Medal of Honor. The record started off with a cover version of "The Ballad of the Green Berets" but was a spoken account with sound effects of Colonel Pat Lawrence (Mike Road) taking two small boys (Andy and George) to visit Fort Bragg, North Carolina, to learn about the training and capabilities of The Green Berets. The album then featured an exciting account of the Battle of Nam Dong where Captain Roger Donlon received the first Medal of Honor in the Vietnam War.

A less successful song was Nancy Ames' "He Wore The Green Beret" with a flip side of "War is a Card Game". Dickie Goodman pitted the two fads of 1966 against each other in Batman & His Grandmother where the Caped Crusader went up against the Green Beret.

== In film ==
The first Special Forces Group on Okinawa provided a number of troopers to act as extras in director Samuel Fuller's Merrill's Marauders (1961) and were credited at film's start. On American television, a March 1962 episode of Surfside 6 titled "The Green Beret" featured SF training. Henry Fonda appeared in, and narrated, a 1962 "Special Forces" episode of The Big Picture series of U.S. Army-produced films that found their way to American television. In 1963, a Green Beret appeared in the episode "In Praise of Pip" of The Twilight Zone though the U.S. Army told the CBS television network to not name the Southeast Asian country where the story occurred. The Green Beret's first Hollywood appearance is in the futuristic thriller film Seven Days in May (1963) wherein Andrew Duggan is a Special Forces officer loyal to the U.S. president, not the traitorous JCS Chief Burt Lancaster; the film also gave the American filmgoer a first glimpse of the M16 rifle.

Film poster for Chrome and Hot Leather (1971)

With all the interest in the Green Berets, a film version seemed a long time in coming. Columbia Pictures had bought the film rights to Robin Moore's book before publication, using the title, The Green Berets, for a screenplay about the training of an SF Team and their deployment in Southeast Asia, but dropped the idea, because of the U.S. Army's many conditions and the American public's dissatisfaction with the Vietnam War. Producer David L. Wolper then bought the rights to The Green Berets and dropped the idea for reasons like Columbia Pictures. A screenplay was written by George Goodman who had served with the Special Forces in the 1950s as a military intelligence officer and had written a 1961 article about the Special Forces called The Unconventional Warriors in Esquire Magazine. Columbia sent Goodman to South Vietnam to research the screenplay. Wolper later produced The Devil's Brigade (1968) with Utah-based National Guard SF soldiers as extras, wearing attractive, but imaginary red berets. Thus, it fell to John Wayne to buy the rights and ask President Lyndon Johnson's help in obtaining the assistance and cooperation of the Pentagon in filming the book. The Army set strict conditions, forbidding Moore to work on or be associated with the film, but considerably facilitated the production of the film though the film trailer has the caption "TOLD TOUGH - LIKE THE BOOK". Despite Wayne's box office prestige and public interest in The Green Berets, the film was rejected by Universal Pictures and Paramount Pictures. Wayne used his Batjac Productions money to make the film, which Warner Bros. profitably released to some public protest. Wayne's version of Moore's The Green Berets begins with a choral version of "The Ballad of the Green Berets" heard behind Wayne Fitzgerald's titles that segue to an SF A-Team putting on a "Disneyland" show for journalists, including skeptical David Janssen. From SF Colonel John Wayne, reporter Janssen wangles a trip to the Vietnam War, and, eventually, participates in a large-scale battle, based on the Battle of Nam Dong. In the end, Janssen tells Wayne "If I write what I feel, I'll be out of a job". Wayne tells Janssen he'll always have one with them. The film's critical reception was very diverse even at the time, Roger Ebert, for example, finding that it was "offensive not only to those who oppose American policy but even to those who support it".

=== Disenchantment ===
As the public wearied of the Green Berets, so did the American Regular Army. The 1969 "Green Beret Murder Case" in which Colonel Robert B. Rheault and several of his men were tried for assassinating a Communist spy was used as a discrediting tactic against the Special Forces. The case also contributed to the plot of the movie Apocalypse Now in which a Green Beret Colonel accused of the same offence has gone rogue.

=== Rambo ===
In 1972, author David Morrell published First Blood, a novel that features a former member of the Army Special Forces named John Rambo. The novel focuses on the struggle Rambo faces when he attempts to return to civilian life following the end of his tour of duty in Vietnam, and he eventually turns to violence. In 1982, a film adaptation of the novel was released, starring Sylvester Stallone. The film altered many aspects of the novel, including excising the self-loathing characteristics the protagonist possesses in the novel. The film was a box office success, and spawned a media franchise.

=== List of films ===
- In 1967, Tom Laughlin made an American International Pictures film called The Born Losers featuring Billy Jack, a half-Native American former Green Beret Vietnam War veteran using his martial arts on a motorcycle gang.
- In the 1968 film, The Green Berets, John Wayne portrays Mike Kirby, a Colonel with the 5th Special Forces Group during the Vietnam War.
- In 1971, in Billy Jack, the main protagonist Tom Laughlin is a "half-breed" American Navajo,[3] a Green Beret Vietnam War veteran, and a hapkido master. The same year Chrome and Hot Leather portrays former Green Beret teaming up with men from his unit to take revenge on the murderers of his girlfriend.
- In the film First Blood (1982), Sylvester Stallone portrays John Rambo, a former Green Beret searching for his old friend from his time in the Special Forces. The film is based on the 1972 novel First Blood by David Morrell. The film altered many aspects of the novel, including excising the self-loathing characteristics the protagonist possesses in the novel. The film was a box office success, and spawned a media franchise.
- In the film Commando (1985), the main protagonist John Matrix, portrayed by Arnold Schwarzenegger, and many of the antagonists are former Special Forces soldiers. One of the more memorable lines in the movie was, "I eat green berets for breakfast, and right now, I'm very hungry!"
- In the film Collateral, the main antagonist Vincent joined the US Army Special Forces before becoming a hitman.
- Executive Decision (1996) features a Special Forces CT team.
- In Dear John (2010), the main character is a Special Forces soldier who reenlists after the terrorist attacks of September 11, 2001.
- Jason Bourne of "The Bourne Identity" fame was a Special Forces Captain in the film series.
- Predator (1987) follows a team of former Special Forces soldiers who are now a US Army rescue team sent to Val Verde to rescue an American politician but are hunted by the Predator.
- In the film Lethal Weapon (1987), one of the two main protagonists was Mel Gibson's character Martin Riggs who before joining the LAPD was a US Army Special Forces sniper at the age of 19 in the Vietnam War.
- The political satire film Wag the Dog (1997) features a parody Special Forces unit called "The 303" including a spoof of "The Ballad of the Green Berets" performed by Huey Lewis; the unit's hallmark beret is half black, half leopard skin pattern.
- In The Objective, the soldiers are an ODA from 3rd SFG.
- In Three Kings, George Clooney plays a Green Beret Major and Delta Operator, Archie Gates.
- In Walking Tall, Dwayne Johnson plays a Special Forces soldier from 5th SFG.
- 12 Strong tells the story of ODA 595, one of the first Special Forces teams deployed to Afghanistan after 9/11.
- In 2010 The A-Team, A reboot of the TV series of same name, the team members are depicted as Rangers instead, though the Special Forces Tab can be seen on their Army Service Uniforms.
- In the 2015 zombie comedy film Range 15, U.S. military veterans portray fictionalized versions of themselves, with a couple of them being former Special Forces. Fictional characters SGM Gene Vandenham and Colonel Holloway are also depicted as Special Forces as they can be seen wearing the Long Tab.
- In the film and TV franchise The Karate Kid/Cobra Kai, the antagonist karate master John Kreese is played by Martin Kove, who is shown to be an ex-Green Beret during Vietnam and the US Army karate champion.
- In the 2016 film Dirty Grandpa, it is revealed that Richard Kelly, played by Robert De Niro, is an ex-Green Beret.
- In the 2018 science fiction action-adventure monster film Rampage, Davis Okoye is a former US Army Special Forces soldier as well as primatologist and head of an anti-poaching unit. The character is portrayed by Dwayne Johnson.
- The 2023 film Guy Ritchie's The Covenant follows a Special Forces team sergeant's quest to help his team's Afghan interpreter escape Afghanistan after being abandoned by the US government.

=== List of television productions ===
- In the TV series Person of Interest (2011), one of the two main protagonists is John Reese, a former Green Beret and CIA field officer, who now lives the life of the "tall guy in a suit".
- In The A-Team (1983–87), the heroes are rogue Special Forces team (from the 5th Special Forces Group) turned crime fighters for hire.
- In the TV series Dynasty, one of the main characters, Dex Dexter (Michael Nader), who appeared on the series from 1983 until its cancellation in 1989, is an ex-special forces operative who is something of an adventurer and often goes on daring missions. On several occasions, he mentions his service in the Vietnam War.
- In the TV series 24, Jack Bauer, the series' main protagonist, was a member of US Army Special Forces before working at CTU Los Angeles. Bauer's participation in a previous Special Forces mission is a significant element of the first season's plot.
- The Unit is a CBS TV action drama series depicting the life of Special Forces soldiers and the Delta Force, based loosely on a book by Eric Haney.
- In the TV series The Simpsons (1989–present), recurring character Principal Skinner is an ex-Green Beret.
- Deadliest Warrior season 1 episode "Green Beret vs Spetsnaz", pitted the U.S. Special Forces went against the Russian Spetsnaz. After running 1000 simulated battles, the Spetsnaz emerged victorious with 519 wins by a very narrow margin.
- Burn Notice's Michael Westen is a former Green Beret and Delta Force Operator.
- In the crime drama The Mentalist, Special Agent Kimball Cho is a former member of the Army Special Forces.
- Knightrider is a TV series about a crime fighter using a technologically advanced car whose main protagonist, Michael Knight, was a former Green Beret.
- Law & Order: Special Victims Unit the squad's former commander Captain Cragen was an ex-Green Beret.
- Cover Up a TV series about a former Green Beret who now serves as a spy posing as a fashion model.
- Taken, a TV series that fills in the background for the Bryan Mills character from the Taken film franchise, the character is revealed to be a former Green Beret.
- Special Forces: Untold Stories, a docudrama television series produced by New Dominion Pictures features an episode about the Green Berets during the Vietnam War.
- In the third season of the Amazon show Bosch, Detective Harry Bosch is revealed to have served in the 5th Special Forces Group during Desert Storm and following the 9/11 attacks. In the same season, Harry Bosch investigates the murder of a former 3rd Special Forces Group Green Beret.

=== Video games ===
Various video games portray characters from the US Army Special Forces:

- In the Metal Gear Solid video game series, the protagonists Solid Snake and Big Boss are former Green Berets.
- Mortal Kombat video game series characters Sonya Blade and Jax Briggs are members of the Special Forces, as are their respective daughters, Cassie Cage and Jacqui Briggs.
- In the video game Left 4 Dead, Bill is a veteran that served in the 1st Special Forces Group.
- Lincoln Clay, the protagonist in Mafia III, served with the 5th Special Forces Group during the Vietnam War.
- Francis O'Brien, a US captain and one of the three commandos in Commandos: Strike Force, is a Green beret.

== Toys ==
Green Beret GI Joe figures courtesy Cap Troopers Base Camp

Mattel toys made "Guerrilla Fighter" playsets in 1962 containing a commando green beret with an interesting tin "Guerrilla Fighter" badge depicting the crossed arrows insignia of the Special Forces, (formerly worn by the 1st Special Service Force, and before that the U.S. Army Indian Scouts) and a jungle knife in front of a parachute. The set also contained the Mattel Dick Tracy automatic cap firing "tommy gun" or "Scattergun" (the Dick Tracy cap firing but no longer water firing riot shotgun) toy guns, both now in military camouflage plastic, a military camouflaged poncho, and in some sets, a rubber Ka-Bar knife and a tripwire booby trap. Mattel later made the "M-16 Marauder", in 1966, which appeared in The Green Berets film wherein an enraged John Wayne smashes one against a tree.

Children could also enjoy Philadelphia Gum "Men of the Green Beret" trading cards of photographs of the Special Forces in action with a stick of bubble gum. The artwork on the box was by artist Norm Saunders of Mars Attacks fame. Aurora Models came out with a model of a Green Beret soldier.
