= John Alan Coey =

American-Rhodesian soldier and medic (1950–1975)

- Coey in the Rhodesian Special Air Service, 1972
- Born: 12 November 1950; Columbus, Ohio, U.S.
- Died: 19 July 1975 (aged 24); Kandeya Tribal Trust Lands, Mashonaland, Rhodesia (today Zimbabwe)
- Military career
- Allegiance: United States (1970–72); Rhodesia (1972–75)
- Branch: United States Marine Corps (1970–72); Rhodesian Army (1972–75)
- Rank: Cadet (1970–72); Trooper (1972–74); Corporal (1974–75)
- Nickname: "The Fighting Doc"
- Units: Rhodesian Special Air Service (1972–74); Rhodesian Army Medical Corps, attached to Rhodesian Light Infantry (1974–75)
- Conflicts: Rhodesian Bush War †

John Alan Coey (12 November 1950 – 19 July 1975) was a U.S. Marine who served in the Rhodesian Army as one of the "Crippled Eagles", a loosely organised group of U.S. expatriates fighting for the unrecognized government of Rhodesia (today Zimbabwe) during that country's Bush War. A devout Christian, vitriolic anti-communist, he was the first American fatality of the war. He moved to Rhodesia to join its army in 1972, the day after graduating from college in his home town of Columbus, Ohio, and served until he was killed in action in 1975. He kept a journal throughout his service that was posthumously published as A Martyr Speaks.

Coey received United States Marine Corps officer training during his studies and was on track to receive a commission when he requested discharge and left for Rhodesia, asserting that the U.S. government had been infiltrated by a "revolutionary conspiracy of internationalists, collectivists and communists" and that fighting for Rhodesia would allow him to better defend Western interests. He joined the Rhodesian Special Air Service (SAS) and passed with the rank of trooper in November 1972, receiving recognition as one of the army's best recruits of the year. However, his political views led to an acrimonious fall from favor within the SAS, his expulsion from its officer training programme in October 1973 and ultimately to his leaving the unit four months later. He redeployed to the Rhodesian Army Medical Corps, from which he was posted to the Rhodesian Light Infantry (RLI) heliborne commando battalion in July 1974, concurrently with his promotion to corporal. He thereafter served as an instructor and commando medic in the RLI.

Though not an officer, Coey exerted some influence on tactical doctrine, making numerous suggestions to his superiors and pioneering the combat medic role in the Rhodesian Army, which caused him to be nicknamed "the Fighting Doc". He was killed in action in Mashonaland in the country's north on 19 July 1975, shot through the head while running into the open to treat two fallen comrades. His remains, originally buried in Que Que in central Zimbabwe, were reinterred in Ohio in 1979. His journal and some of his letters home were compiled into A Martyr Speaks by his mother soon after he died, and published in 1988.

== Early life ==
John Alan Coey was born in Columbus, Ohio, on 12 November 1950, to George and Phyllis Coey, both devout Lutherans. While growing up, John was a keen Boy Scout and attained the organization's top rank, Eagle Scout. He attended Ohio State University's campus in his home town, studying forestry, and during his studies enlisted in the United States Marine Corps' officer training program as a cadet in its Platoon Leaders Class. During this time he also taught Sunday school at St. Paul's Lutheran Church, Columbus, Ohio where he was a member.

Like his parents, Coey was a fervent Christian, and held forthright views on communism, which he believed was an inherently evil system of government, geared towards the ultimate destruction of Christianity and the West; he later wrote of the murder of 65 million people by communists in China and the Soviet Union since the October Revolution of 1917, "and the souls of millions more ... indoctrinated with atheism". In Coey's opinion, only the retention of a society rooted in traditional Western culture and Christian faith would prevent this from happening elsewhere.

== Military career ==
=== Motivations ===
Rhodesia (today Zimbabwe), highlighted in red on a map of Africa

Coey was on track to receive an officer's commission into the Marines as soon as he graduated from college, but he became severely disillusioned by the course of the Vietnam War. Puzzled by America's failure to win the war, he developed a theory that the United States government had been infiltrated by a "revolutionary conspiracy of internationalists, collectivists and communists", which he claimed was deliberately bringing about defeat in Vietnam to demoralize Americans as a precursor to bringing the United States under a totalitarian world government. His attention was caught by the situation in Rhodesia (today Zimbabwe), where a war pitted the unrecognized government, made up predominantly of the country's minority whites, against communist-backed black nationalist guerrilla groups. Coey interpreted this as Rhodesia "holding the line" on the behalf of Christendom against communism, and surmised that he would better serve the United States and the Western world if he fought in the Rhodesian Army rather than the US Marine Corps. He successfully requested a discharge from the Marines just before he would have received his commission, and flew to southern Africa the day after he graduated from Ohio State in late March 1972 to join the Rhodesian Army.

Foreigners like Coey who volunteered for the Rhodesian Army received the same pay and conditions of service as local regulars. Ideologically and religiously motivated, Coey viewed himself as a kind of latter-day crusader. He kept a thorough journal of his thoughts and experiences throughout his army service. "I believe God intended me to come here for some purpose," he wrote soon after enlisting. "This action has cost me an Officer's Commission, and ... my citizenship may be revoked, [but] this is the most I can do for my country under the circumstances." He told the historian Gerald Horne that he believed communists had already compromised top levels of the US government, and that by serving in Rhodesia he was helping to unify "his people" against a foreign conspiracy. His religious views also affected his views on Zionism: he believed that the State of Israel's existence prior to the Second Coming of Christ was contrary to scriptural prophecies and that it should therefore be destroyed.

=== Special Air Service ===
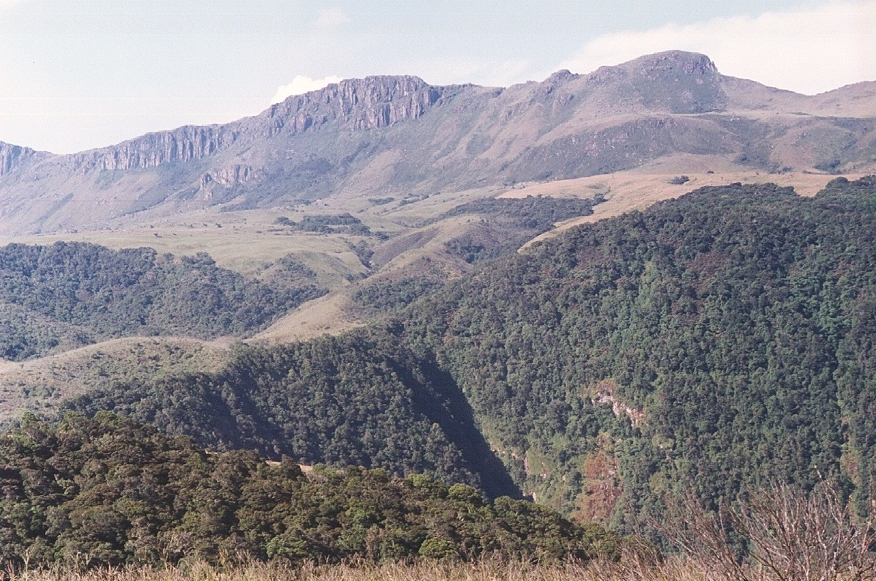
Mount Inyangani, Zimbabwe's highest peak. Coey climbed the mountain on 29 May 1972 as part of his SAS training. When he reached the top, he crudely tied a US flag to a stick, planted it on the summit and posed beside it. The resulting photograph appears on the front cover of his book A Martyr Speaks.

Though foreign soldiers in the Rhodesian Army were only required to immediately commit to three years' service, Coey volunteered on arrival for at least five. He joined the Special Air Service (SAS), an elite commando unit. He was one of several foreigners in his barrack room, and they decorated their quarters with the flags of their home countries. Coey performed well during his initial training, and was recognized as one of the Rhodesian Army's top recruits of 1972; after passing out in November that year with the rank of trooper, he was picked out in January 1973 for instruction as an officer. While training for this new role, he contributed articles to various Rhodesian and South African publications, sending work to the latter under the Afrikaans pseudonym "Johann Coetzee". The political and religious views reflected in his journal continued: on 18 September 1973, he expressed profound joy at the overthrow of Chile's Marxist President Salvador Allende, and painted the incident as a victory for Christianity and the West.

In October 1973, Coey submitted an inflammatory article detailing his views on America's foreign policy to the army magazine, Assegai; the firmly anti-establishment piece, "The Myth of American Anti-communism", was deemed "subversive" by the army, which blocked its publication. Coey was removed from the officer training programme soon after, officially because of his "temperament". Though disappointed by his expulsion, and suspicious about the true reasoning behind it, Coey did not complain, writing that as an ordinary trooper he would be free to broadcast his views to the public unhindered.

Coey first saw combat action in November 1973, in a covert external operation in Portuguese Mozambique's north-western Tete Province. He enjoyed it, comparing the experience to the American Indian Wars of the 19th century. The following month, however, he was informed by his commanding officer that he would not be used as a paratrooper, and would not be going on patrol again, as he was, in the commander's words, "not worth it". Coey felt so humiliated that he considered leaving, but resolved to stay and fight on. Despite his commander's order to remain on base, he joined a patrol into Mozambique and crossed the border on 7 January 1974. The commanding officer flew into a rage when he discovered Coey's insubordination two weeks later, and immediately had him brought back. Meanwhile, Coey persevered with "The Myth of American Anti-communism", and secured its publication in the conservative, nationally distributed journal Property and Finance on 7 February 1974. Five days later, he was barred from taking part in a parachute exercise with his unit, and on 14 February, he was instructed to choose another army corps or regiment by the 18th; the SAS no longer wanted him.

=== Rhodesian Light Infantry ===
Coey's request to transfer to the Rhodesian Army Medical Corps was granted, and he was accordingly placed in a three-month medical course in Bulawayo, starting in April 1974. On its completion in July, he was promoted to corporal and posted to the Rhodesian Light Infantry (RLI) heliborne commando battalion, where he was installed as an instructor. He expressed pride in teaching "as we did at Quantico—the Marine way!" He was pleased to meet other Americans in the RLI, particularly when they were fellow US Marines. The American expatriates in the Rhodesian forces tended to try to stay together and associate with each other. They were later informally dubbed the "Crippled Eagles" by the American author Robin Moore, who moved to Salisbury in August 1976 and became their unofficial patron. Coey liked and respected his fellow soldiers, who in turn regarded him as strong, capable and brave, but there was mutual animosity concerning their respective lifestyles while off-duty. "They live for pleasure mostly," Coey wrote in his journal, "drinking and whoring. The Christian soldier is sometimes despised and ridiculed."

Coey acquitted himself well in the eyes of his superiors following his move to the RLI, and soon after joining the unit mustered into Support Group as a specialist in tracking, mortars and armored vehicle driving, while also working as a medic. He took part in over 60 Fireforce missions in this capacity and became nicknamed "the Fighting Doc" because of his vehement insistence on joining such combat excursions. Although his political views had prevented him from becoming an officer, he continued to make tactical suggestions to his superiors, some of which were adopted; for example, combat medics were introduced to RLI patrols at his suggestion, and following his example. However, other ideas of Coey's—such as his proposed use of psychochemical weapons and the "weapon of starvation" against Mozambicans and Zambians—were less well received.

On recovering his journal, Coey's family discovered that portions of it which discussed army operations in too much detail—sometimes brief passages, but occasionally whole months at a time—had been censored by the army, and in some cases removed entirely. Apart from an entry on 26 December 1974, in which Coey wrote about his loneliness at Christmas and desire to get married, not a word remained after 11 November 1974. Having become engaged to a young Rhodesian woman, Coey successfully filed for Rhodesian citizenship while on leave in June 1975, then renewed his US passport in South Africa. "What a chuckle," he wrote to a friend, "filling out those papers under a portrait of Henry Kissinger!"

=== Death ===
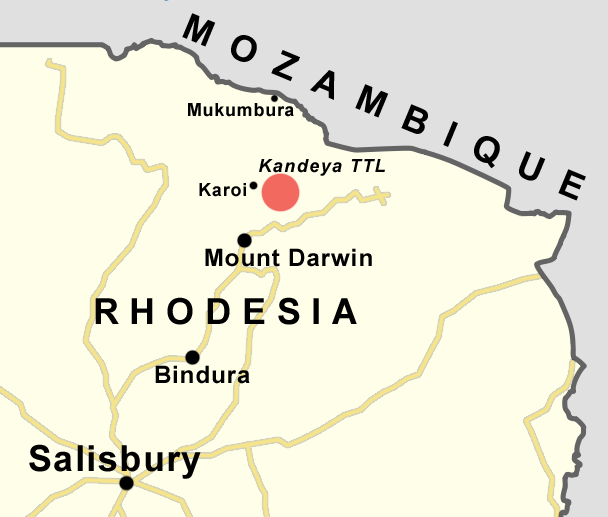
The rough location of where Coey was killed is highlighted in red on this map.

On 19 July 1975, a unit from the Rhodesian Territorial Force (TF) contacted a group of guerrillas near a river in the Kandeya Tribal Trust Lands, north-east of Mount Darwin in the area covered by Operation Hurricane. After the Territorials killed two of the insurgents without loss, the cadres fell back and set up an ambush position underneath the roots of some overhanging trees on the riverbank. The TF patrol summoned a Fireforce made up of 7 and 10 Troops, 2 Commando, RLI from Mount Darwin, which arrived soon after. Coey, who was attached to 2 Commando at the time, accompanied 7 Troop as the patrol's combat medic.

The Territorials and 10 Troop made a sweep of the river line, but on rounding a bend in the stream were suddenly fired upon by the hidden guerrillas. A sergeant from the TF was killed, as well as Rifleman Hennie Potgeiter of the RLI. RLI Rifleman Ken Lucas suffered a gunshot wound to the leg. The insurgents now held their fire to prevent giving their position away. Incorrectly believing from the inactivity that the cadres had fled, and thinking that the two fallen soldiers were still alive, Major Hank Meyer ordered the leader of 7 Troop, Lieutenant Joe du Plooy, to sweep around the river and send Coey out to treat the men.

Lieutenant du Plooy led his men around the bend, carefully keeping them behind cover, then sent Coey out into the open riverbed to give treatment. With his Red Cross flag clearly visible, Coey came out from cover and made for the bodies on the ground. The concealed cadres immediately opened fire and fatally shot him through the head. His lifeless body fell at du Plooy's feet. Coey was the first American fatality of the Rhodesian Bush War. The contact in which he died eventually ended with du Plooy and two other Rhodesians being wounded and a further Rhodesian soldier, Corporal Jannie de Beer, being killed. The insurgents escaped without any further loss to their number.

== Reactions to death, funeral and burial ==
He was a noble dedicated man with spiritual insight and political acumen with a keen perception of world affairs and the evils of communism ... he was a soldier of the Cross and a son of liberty.

— Extract from a profile of Coey maintained by the RLI Regimental Association

Coey's parents received letters of consolation from across the world, including one from Lester Maddox, the governor of Georgia, and another from the secretary of the Liberty Lobby. Coey was never a member of any radical political group, but his life and death were still used as propaganda by some such movements: according to The Nation, Coey was "eulogized in the American Nazi paper", and, on 4 July 1976, Willis Carto of the Liberty Lobby announced a posthumous award to Coey to commemorate the bicentenary of the United States. Members of the Rhodesian public donated money to help the Coey family travel to Rhodesia to attend his funeral service. On arrival, Coey's parents told the Salisbury Sunday Mail that they believed his death had not been in vain, as he had fallen defending "the last bastion for fighting communism that is left in the Western world".

[Coey was] almost hysterical with anxiety about Chinese influence in the region ... by the spring of 1974 his worries had become almost delusional ... [his] anti-communism was mixed liberally with white supremacy, for the arrival of the communists meant the rule of Africans, the falling of 'standards' and the collapse of 'civilization'. To prevent this catastrophe, any amount of brutality could be rationalized ...

— Marxist Black Historian Gerald Horne describes Coey

On 28 July 1975, Coey received a full military funeral and was buried in the central Rhodesian town of Que Que, where he had been living. With his parents standing by, Coey's brother, Edward, gave a eulogy that strongly stressed his family's religious and ideological beliefs—he said that his brother had achieved "the greatest of Christian virtues: sacrifice".

When the family returned to Ohio, Phyllis Coey compiled her son's journal and a selection of his letters home into a book entitled A Martyr Speaks, which she first attempted to have published in 1975. Because of the controversial views it contained (including Coey's dedication of his journal "to the 100,000 American dead of Korea and Vietnam who were betrayed by their own government"), the book was turned down by publishers for over a decade. Coey's remains were reburied in Ohio in 1979, near to his family home. A Martyr Speaks was released in 1988, 13 years after his death, by the New Puritan Library, a religious press in North Carolina.

== Publications ==
- Coey, John Alan (March 1988). Brooks, Pat (ed.). A Martyr Speaks (First ed.). Fletcher, North Carolina: New Puritan Library. ISBN 978-0-932050-41-0.

== Notes and references ==
=== Online sources ===
- Hitt, Nancy (2008). "'The Saints': Sacrificial Lambs of the U.S." Rhodesian Light Infantry Regimental Association.
- "John Alan Coey". Rhodesian Light Infantry Regimental Association. Archived from the original on 4 February 2012.

=== Newspaper and journal articles ===
- Drew, James (3 November 1997). "Conspriracy buffs swap true tails of distrust". The Blade. Toledo, Ohio: Block Communications. pp. 1, 3. Archived from the original on 19 November 2022.
- "American mercenaries fighting for Rhodesians". The Morning Record. Meridien-Wallingford, Connecticut: The Meridien Record Company. 18 November 1975. p. 20.
- "Chimurenga war communiqué No. 8. Period from 30 Jan to 20 March 1974". Lusaka: Zimbabwe African National Union. 27 March 1974.

=== Bibliography ===
- Binda, Alexandre (May 2008). The Saints: The Rhodesian Light Infantry. Johannesburg: 30° South Publishers. ISBN 978-1-920143-07-7.
- Cilliers, Jakkie (December 1984). Counter-Insurgency in Rhodesia. London, Sydney & Dover, New Hampshire: Croom Helm. ISBN 978-0-7099-3412-7.
- Coey, John Alan (March 1988). Brooks, Pat (ed.). A Martyr Speaks (First ed.). Fletcher, North Carolina: New Puritan Library. ISBN 978-0-932050-41-0.
- Horne, Gerald (December 2000). From the Barrel of a Gun: The United States and the War against Zimbabwe, 1965–1980. Chapel Hill, North Carolina: University of North Carolina Press. ISBN 978-0-8078-4903-3.
- Moorcraft, Paul L.; McLaughlin, Peter (April 2008) [1982]. The Rhodesian War: A Military History. Barnsley: Pen and Sword Books. ISBN 978-1-84415-694-8.
- The Nation. Volume 222. New York: The Nation Company. 1976.
