= Robert Lowell Moore =

American hotelier (1896–1986)

- Born: January 12, 1896; Cambridge, Massachusetts, United States
- Died: April 23, 1986 (aged 90)
- Education: Harvard College, Massachusetts Institute of Technology
- Occupation: Entrepreneur
- Known for: Co-founder of the Sheraton Hotels and Resorts
- Spouse: Eleanor Turner (m. 1924)
- Children: 5, including Robin Moore

Robert Lowell Moore (January 12, 1896 - April 23, 1986) was an American businessman who was the co-founder of the Sheraton Hotels and Resorts international chain along with his college roommate Ernest Henderson. He was also the father of author Robin Moore.

== Early life, military service and education ==
Robert Lowell Moore was born on January 12, 1896 to James Lowell Moore and Jane Hancox Newell in Cambridge, Massachusetts. Through his maternal grandmother, Moore was a descendant of the minister William Wells.

Moore grew up and attended high school in Wayland, Massachusetts. He then attended Harvard College where he was roommates with Ernest Henderson. Together the two would create and grow the international chain of Sheraton Hotels and Resorts.

In 1916 Moore took leave from Harvard to work as an ambulance driver in France during World War I. In 1917 he enlisted in the United States Army Air Service and served as a pilot. After the war, Moore enrolled in the Massachusetts Institute of Technology, and in 1921 he graduated with a degree in business engineering.

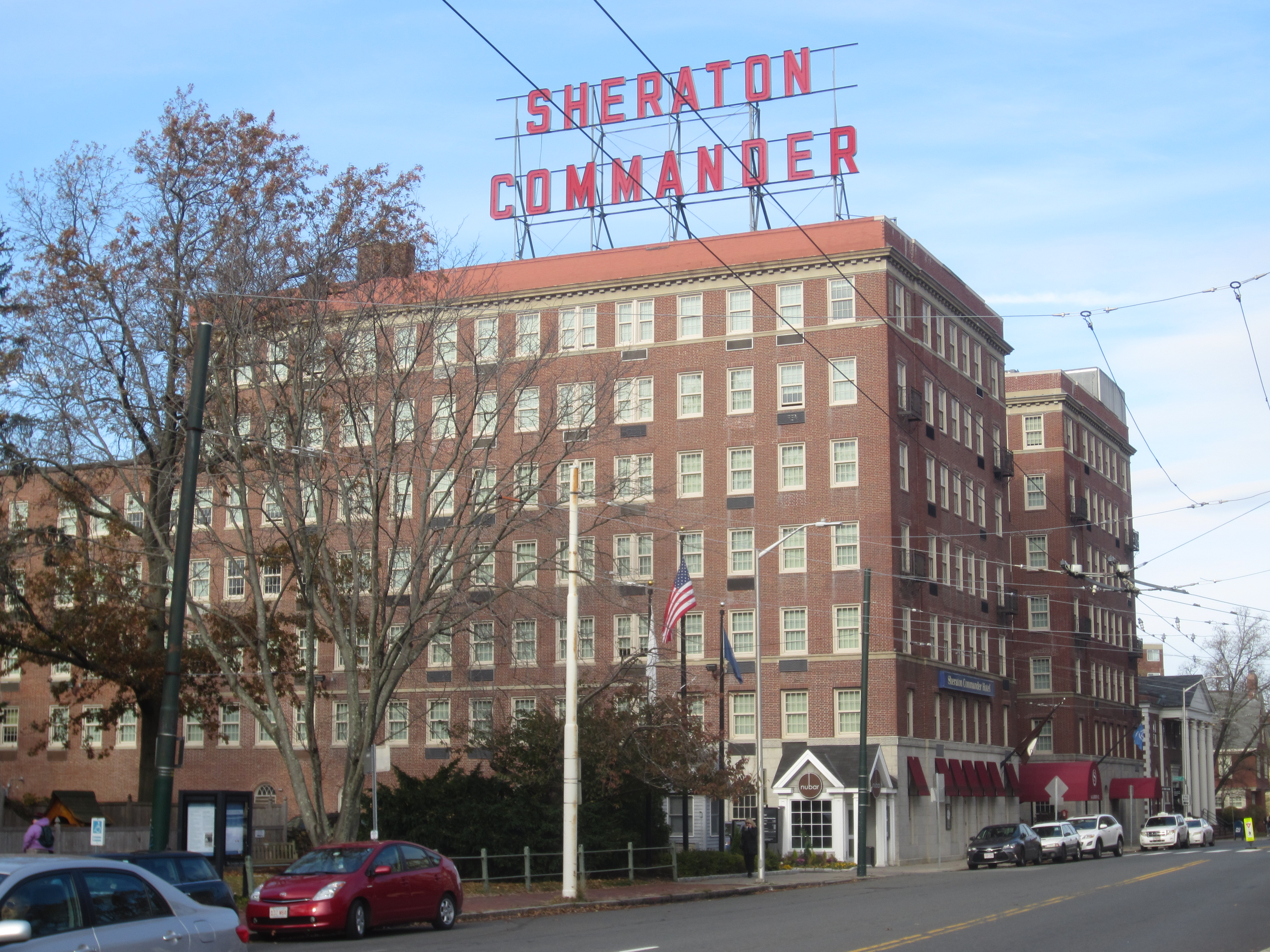
The Sheraton Commander Hotel in Harvard Square with its distinctive electric sign on the roof.

== Career ==
In 1934, Moore and Henderson began buying depressed real estate and specialized in reviving declining hotels. Their third hotel purchase was the Sheraton Hotel located in Harvard Square. Because of the large electric sign on its roof advertising the hotel, Moore and Henderson decided to use that name for future hotels.

Moore and Henderson bought Copley Plaza in 1944 and made it their flagship hotel. In 1948, their company merged with U.S. Realty & Improvement Corporation to become Sheraton Corp. of America. In 1968 International Telephone & Telegraph Corp. bought Sheraton.

== Personal life ==
In 1924, Moore married Eleanor Turner, an artist and book illustrator. Together the two had five children: writer and astrologer Marcia Moore, author Robert “Robin” Moore, John S. Moore, William K. Moore, and Paul Fox. Moore died on April 23, 1986.
