= Green hat =

Green hat may refer to:

- Green hat, in de Bono's Six Thinking Hats
- Green hat, an ecclesiastical hat for a bishop
- Green hat, a Chinese term for cuckold
- Green Hat, a 2004 film
- Green Hat Films, a film company of Todd Phillips
- The Green Hat (novel), by Michael Arlen, 1924
  - The Green Hat (play)

== See also ==
- Green beret (disambiguation)
