= The Khaki Mafia =

1971 novel by Robin Moore and June Collins

- First edition
- Author: Robin Moore and June Collins
- Genre: Fiction
- Published: Crown
- Media type: Print
- Pages: 284
- OCLC: 216409

The Khaki Mafia is a novel about the Vietnam War by Robin Moore and June Collins, published by Crown in 1971. Collins was an entertainer who had performed for US troops in Vietnam and later testified before a U.S. Senate committee about corruption among senior military personnel. The novel's lead character, an entertainer named Jody T. Neale, is based on Collins, who used the professional name Junie Moon, and the plot details diversion of taxpayer money and other criminal activities by U.S. military officials in the war zone.

In the mid-1960s, Moore had written The Green Berets, a novel celebrating the U.S. role in the Vietnam War. He later wrote The Happy Hooker with Xaviera Hollander, considered a "portrait of a sexual revolution." The Khaki Mafia takes a far more negative view of U.S. involvement in Vietnam than did the previous war novel, reflecting the spread of anti-war attitudes among Americans late in the conflict. Collins wrote other books about the Vietnam War: Goodbye Junie Moon and its sequel, Junie Moon Rising.
