= D. M. Turner =

American drug researcher (1962–1996)

- Born: 5 October 1962
- Died: 31 December 1996 (aged 34)
- Other name: Joseph Vivian
- Known for: Books on psychoactive drugs
- Notable work: The Essential Psychedelic Guide (1994); Salvinorin: The Psychedelic Essence of Salvia Divinorum (1996)

D.M. Turner (born Joseph Vivian; 5 October 1962 – 31 December 1996) was an author, psychedelic researcher, and psychonaut who wrote two books on psychoactive drugs and entheogens. His first book, The Essential Psychedelic Guide, showcased his views on the subjective effects of various psychoactive and hallucinogenic substances. His second book, Salvinorin, addressed the effects of Salvia divinorum. Turner died after injecting an unknown quantity of ketamine while in a bathtub, drowning while presumably incapacitated by the effects of the drug.

== Works ==
- 1994: The Essential Psychedelic Guide (ISBN 0-9642636-1-0)
- 1996: Salvinorin: The Psychedelic Essence of Salvia Divinorum (ISBN 0-9642636-2-9)

== See also ==
- John C. Lilly
- Marcia Moore
- Alexander Shulgin
