= American volunteers in the Rhodesian Bush War =

The Crippled Eagles
- Dates active: July 1964–1979
- Active regions: / Rhodesia (now Zimbabwe)
- Status: Defunct
- Size: ~400 American volunteers

There were a number of American volunteers in the Rhodesian Bush War who fought with the Rhodesian Security Forces. These men were nick-named the Crippled Eagles by author Robin Moore, who offered a house in Salisbury as a meeting place for the Americans who served in all units of the security forces, but never had their own unit. The name "Crippled Eagle" and their badge was meant to symbolise what they considered their abandonment by the US government. Robin Moore and Barbara Fuca tried to publish a book with the same title, but because of the political controversy the book was refused by publishers and appeared only in 1991, when it was published as The White Tribe.

== Background ==
One of the reasons for many of the American citizens who joined the Crippled Eagles was the Soldier of Fortune reports about both the Rhodesian Bush War and the means of entry into the Rhodesian Army. From 1976 to 1980 almost every issue contained one or more articles about the ongoing conflict. The first issue of the magazine in 1975 actually contained two such articles, prompting some Americans to travel to Rhodesia. After 1980, their attention turned to Angola, Soweto and other hotspots around the world.

Approximately 400 Americans, some with previous combat experience in Vietnam and other theatres, others with none, volunteered to fight in the Rhodesian Security Forces during the Rhodesian Bush War as ordinary soldiers, earning a pay packet in local currency equal to that of a Rhodesian regular, under the same conditions of service. The Americans suffered seven combat fatalities and many others were wounded in combat, some maimed for life. Five served in Rhodesia's most prestigious unit, the Selous Scouts.

The United States' Neutrality Act prohibits American citizens from enlisting with foreign militaries or working as mercenaries for other governments. Despite this, the United States government did little to slow the flow of volunteers to Rhodesia. There is evidence that the Departments of Justice and State tacitly encouraged Americans to volunteer for Rhodesia as part of efforts to prevent the country's collapse prior to a negotiated solution to the war. The Carter Administration considered taking steps to stop Americans serving with Rhodesia, but this did not result in any policy changes. The activities of Americans in Rhodesia were widely publicised in the United States, leading to protests.

Many of the American volunteers wrongly believed that their government opposed their presence in the country, with articles in Soldier of Fortune and works by Robin Moore also claiming this. In 1976 Moore established what he called the "Unofficial US Embassy" in Salisbury, and began hosting events for the American volunteers as well as doctoral students. He encouraged the volunteers to call themselves 'Crippled Eagles' due to the perception that they were being harassed, or could be harassed, by their government. He also sold t-shirts, sew-on patches and other merchandise using the 'Crippled Eagle' motif and wrote a book that argued that Rhodesia was not racist which included profiles of foreign volunteers.

In 1975, American volunteers Craig Acheson and Joe Belisario were arrested in Botswana, while doing a job for the Rhodesian Security Forces. Both men were leaders in the fanatically anti-communist group known as Veterans and Volunteers for Vietnam, an organization which vowed to keep sending Americans to keep fighting in the Vietnam War after the withdrawal of American forces. Acheson and Belisario were both convicted of firearm charges and each sentenced to six months in prison.

Like the other foreign volunteers in Rhodesia, the Americans often received a hostile reception from their comrades in Rhodesian units. This led to some of the Americans deserting before the end of their contract.

== Members killed ==
During the course of its existence the following seven American citizens died in Rhodesia:

Name	Rank	Rhodesian Force Number	Date Killed	Details
John Alan Coey	Corporal	725702	19 July 1975	John Alan Coey graduated from Ohio State University in 1972 and flew to Rhodesia the day after he graduated. He first served in the Rhodesian Special Air Service (Rhodesian SAS), and afterwards in the Rhodesian Light Infantry (RLI), in the Second Commando, with the attached Rhodesian Army Medical Corps. He was killed in action on 19 July 1975 by a gunshot wound. He was the first American out of the Crippled Eagles to die in Rhodesia. His journal, A Martyr Speaks, was published in 1988, posthumously.
George William Clarke	Trooper	728197	15 May 1977	Clarke was born in Canada, he came from a family of nine children. He lived in South Africa, and later in Southern California, according to some sources. He was a Vietnam veteran, serving in the United States Marine Corps, and was decorated with the Purple Heart twice during his marine career. Prior to joining the RLI, Clarke served as a paramedic in Richmond, British Columbia, Canada. He was aged 28 when he was killed in action. He was killed on 15 May 1977 around Mtoko, in the then Tribal Trust Land, inside Rhodesia proper.
Richard L. Biederman	Sergeant	726685	6 December 1977	Biederman was from Minnesota, served as a sergeant in the Rhodesian SAS. Biederman was a member of the NSWPP. He died on active service on 6 December 1977, in Gaza Province Mozambique from friendly fire during an SAS Patrol.
Frank P. Battaglia	Trooper	728515	6 March 1978	Battaglia was born in Florida, but later moved to New York. He was a Vietnam veteran having served with the US Army 173rd Airborne, and was reportedly wounded twice in the Vietnam War. He also served a full contract with the Spanish Foreign Legion. He came to Rhodesia with his wife, and went to C squadron SAS training troop. After SAS training he joined the RLI, the 3 Commando, 14 Troop. He was killed in action on 6 March 1978, around Kavalamanja in Zambia during Operation Turmoil, by a Zimbabwe People's Revolutionary Army machine gun. Battaglia's wife served with the Rhodesian Air Force, packing parachutes. He was an avid poker player and gave some young Rhodesian soldiers poker lessons while playing for matches.
Joseph Patrick Byrne	Trooper	728721	26 October 1978	Joseph Patrick Byrne was an Irish-American from Kearny, New Jersey. He joined the Rhodesian Army in October 1977. He was a regular in the crowd of foreign volunteers that socialised in the Monomatapa Hotel and a friend of American author Robin Moore. He joined 3 Commando, RLI on 24 March 1978 from Recruit Intake 162. He was killed in action during Operation Repulse at the age of 26, on 26 October 1978 around Middle Sabi or Lower Sabi inside in the Mutema Tribal Trust Land, in Rhodesia proper when his patrol came under fire in an area devoid of cover.
Stephen Michael Dwyer	Trooper	729803	16 July 1979	Stephen Michael Dwyer was from Boston, Massachusetts. He served a tour with the US Marine Corps in Korea. He joined the RLI, the 3 Commando. He was killed in action at the age of 27, while coming to the aid of fatally wounded fellow American, Hugh John McCall, on 16 July 1979 on the Buffalo Range Area, in Rhodesia proper.
Hugh John McCall	Sergeant	727941	16 July 1979	Hugh John McCall was a Vietnam veteran, having served with the US Army 173rd Airborne. He was killed in action on 16 July 1979 on the Buffalo Range Area, in Rhodesia proper.

== Notes ==
=== Works cited ===
- Voß, Klaas (January 2016). "Plausibly deniable: mercenaries in US covert interventions during the Cold War, 1964–1987". Cold War History. 16 (1): 37–60. doi:10.1080/14682745.2015.1078312. S2CID 155764949.
- White, Luise (2021). Fighting and Writing: The Rhodesian Army at War and Postwar. Durham, North Carolina: Duke University Press. ISBN 9781478021285.
