= Al Dempsey =

American author of historical fiction

Al Dempsey is an American author of historical fiction.

== Tim Kyle ==
Dempsey's spy series "Pulsar" (co-written with Robin Moore), contains the books The London Connection and The Italian Connection. They feature the main character Tim Kyle, the lead agent for the security corporation Pulsar International. Kyle is notable among spy novel protagonists for being happily married with children and relying largely on his "computer-like" brain to solve cases.

== Published works ==
- Phase of Darkness, (co-written with Robin Moore) Third Press, 1974. ISBN 978-0345244291
- The London Switch, (co-written with Robin Moore) Pinnacle Books, 1974 ISBN 978-0523003511
- The Red Falcons, (co-written with Robin Moore) Pinnacle Books, 1976 ISBN 978-0722129173
- Dog Kill, Prentice Hall, 1976.
- The London Connection: Pulsar No. 1, (co-written with Robin Moore) Severn House, 1980 ISBN 978-0727806277
- The Italian Connection: Pulsar No. 2, (co-written with Robin Moore) Severn House, 1981 ISBN 978-0523003931
- Miss Finney Kills Now and Then, Tom Doherty Associates, LLC, 1982 ISBN 978-0812581904
- The Stendal Raid, Critics Choice Paperbacks/Lorevan Publishing, Inc., 1985, ISBN 0-931773-17-2
- Copper, Tom Doherty Associates, LLC, 1989. Story of Butte, Montana, in the 1880s. Butte was the site of a large copper mine, and the entrepreneurs known as the Copper Kings.
- What Law There Was, Tom Doherty Associates, LLC, 1991, ISBN 0-312-85113-8. Based on a true story, this novel of the gold rush in Montana covers the rise of an organized crime gang called the "Innocents", led by sheriff Henry Plumber. The Innocents robbed, murdered and terrorized the community until an organized vigilante group attacked them with late-night visits and anonymous hangings.
- Path of the Sun, Tor Books, 1992, ISBN 0-312-85403-X. The United States in the 1880s.
- Pika Don, Tor Books, 1993, ISBN 0-8125-0939-0. The Japanese use an atomic bomb on the U.S. for revenge.
- American Empire Oil, Tom Doherty Associates, LLC, ISBN 0-312-93167-0
- American Empire Beef, Tom Doherty Associates, LLC, ISBN 0-312-93166-2
