= Jungle War Stories =

American war comic book series

- Cover of the first issue (Jul-Sep 1962).

Publication information
- Publisher: Dell Comics
- Genre: War comic
- Publication date: 1962

Jungle War Stories was a Dell Comics American comic book first published in 1962. It was the first American war comic to cover the Vietnam War. Though the cover of the first issue read "The Jungles of Africa and Asia Have Become Flaming Battlegrounds," only Vietnam was covered.

== Characters ==
The stories involved the adventures of three American Korean War veterans, pilot Captain Duke Larsen, Sergeant "Cactus" Kane of the U.S. Army Rangers (who wore an ARVN Ranger Beret), and "G.I." Mike Williams (who wore a bush hat) that trained and fought with the Vietnamese Rangers. Each issue featured a non-fiction page about the war in Vietnam.

== Transformation ==
Issue #12 in July 1965 changed its title to Guerilla War; the comic lasting until issue #14 in March 1966. In January 1967, Dell began publishing Tales of the Green Beret that lasted five issues to 1969.
