= Roger Donlon =

US Army officer and Medal of Honor recipient (1934–2024)

Roger H.C. Donlon
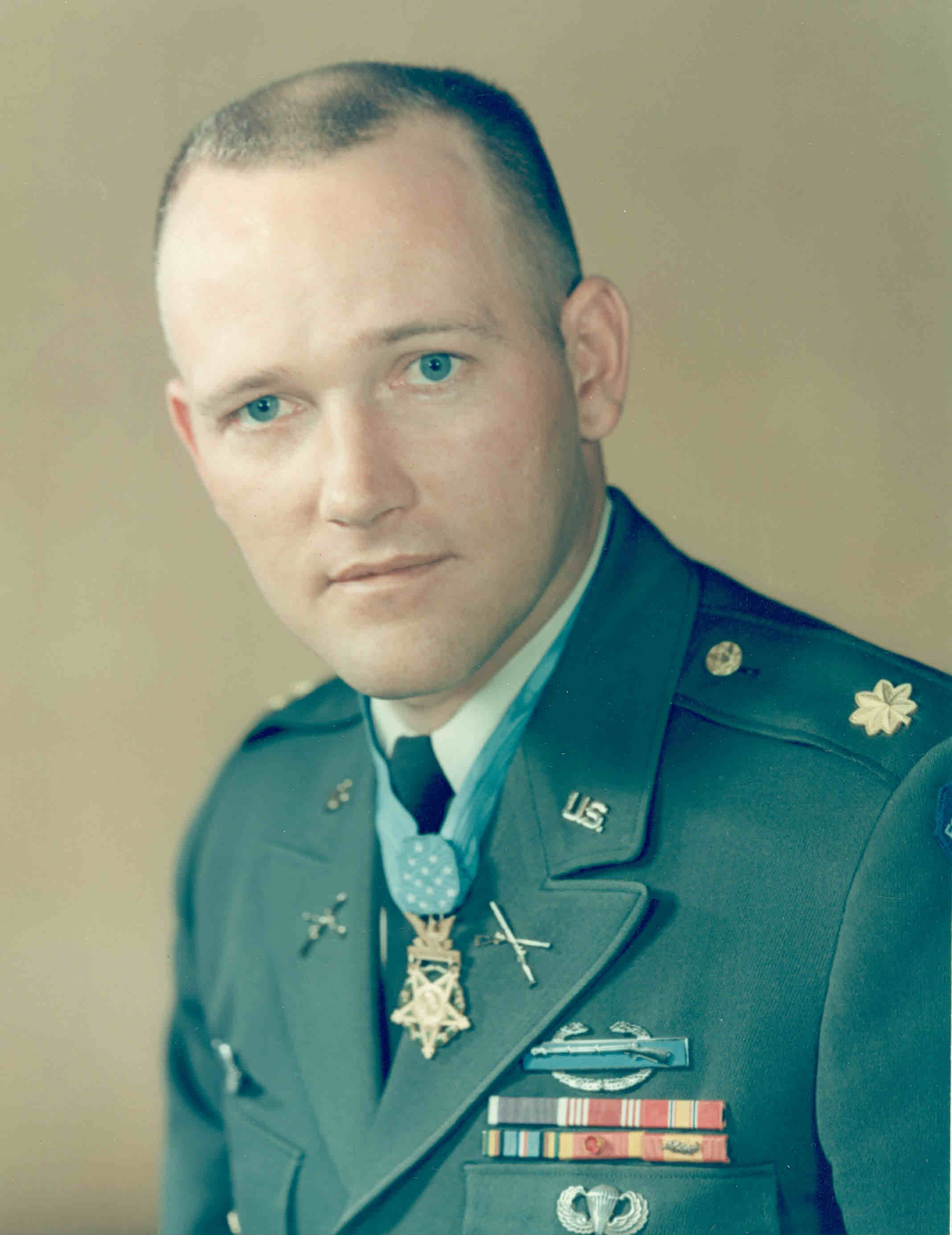
- Born: January 30, 1934; Saugerties, New York, U.S.
- Died: January 25, 2024 (aged 89); Leavenworth, Kansas, U.S.
- Military career
- Allegiance: United States
- Branch: United States Air Force; United States Army
- Service years: 1953–1955; 1958–1988
- Rank: Colonel
- Unit: 7th Special Forces Group
- Conflicts: Vietnam War; Battle of Nam Dong
- Awards: Medal of Honor; Legion of Merit; Bronze Star Medal; Purple Heart

Roger Hugh Charles Donlon (January 30, 1934 – January 25, 2024) was a United States Army officer. He was the first person to receive the Medal of Honor in the Vietnam War, as well as the first member of the United States Army Special Forces to be so honored.

== Early life and education ==
Donlon was born in Saugerties, New York, the eighth child of ten. He attended the New York State College of Forestry at Syracuse University for a year. He joined the United States Air Force in 1953 and was admitted to West Point in 1955, but resigned for personal reasons. He re-enlisted, this time in the United States Army, in 1958, went to Officer Candidate School, and served as a general's aide. In August 1963 he joined the Special Forces. He earned a bachelor's degree from the University of Nebraska Omaha in 1967.

== Career ==
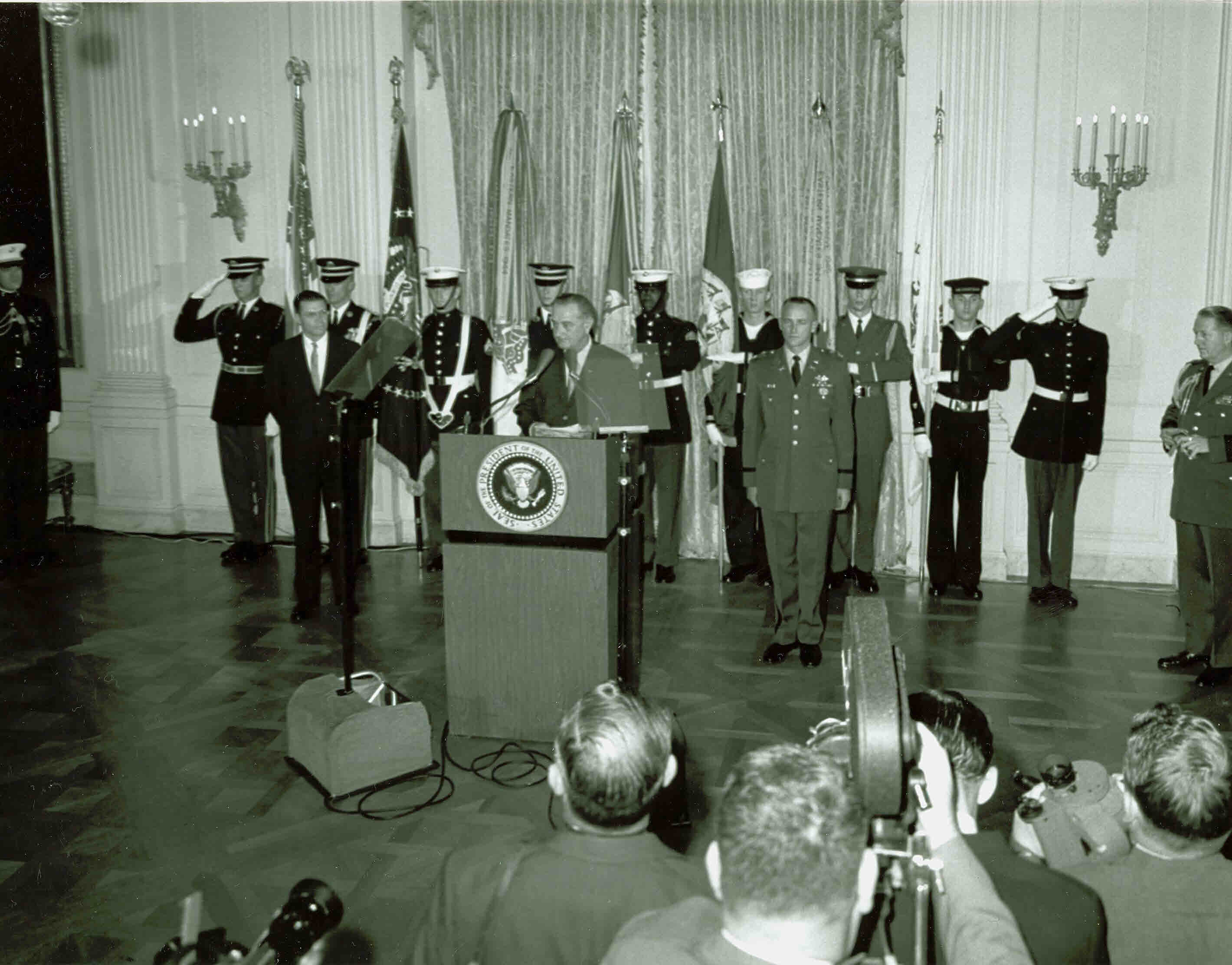
Donlon (standing at right, at attention) waits to receive his Medal of Honor from U.S. President Lyndon B. Johnson.

In May 1964, Donlon's team was sent to Vietnam where they established an outpost at Nam Dong, about 15 miles (24 km) from the border with Laos. Early in the morning of July 6, 1964, the base was attacked by a large force of Vietcong. Under Captain Donlon's leadership, the two-battalion attack was repelled. Donlon received the Medal of Honor for his actions. Donlon later retired at the rank of colonel.

Donlon was awarded the key to the city of Lexington, Kentucky, by Mayor Fred Fugazzi on June 28, 1965.

In 1965, Donlon received the Golden Plate Award of the American Academy of Achievement.

== Later life and death ==
Donlon wrote two books about his experiences in the Vietnam War: Outpost of Freedom and Beyond Nam Dong. He lived in Kansas with his wife, Norma, and children.

Roger Donlon died in Leavenworth, Kansas on January 25, 2024, five days before his 90th birthday.

=== Medal of Honor citation ===
Rank and organization: Captain, U.S. Army. Place and date: Near Nam Dong, Republic of Vietnam, July 6, 1964. Entered service at: Fort Chaffee, Arkansas. Born: January 30, 1934, Saugerties, New York. General Orders No. 41: December 17, 1964.

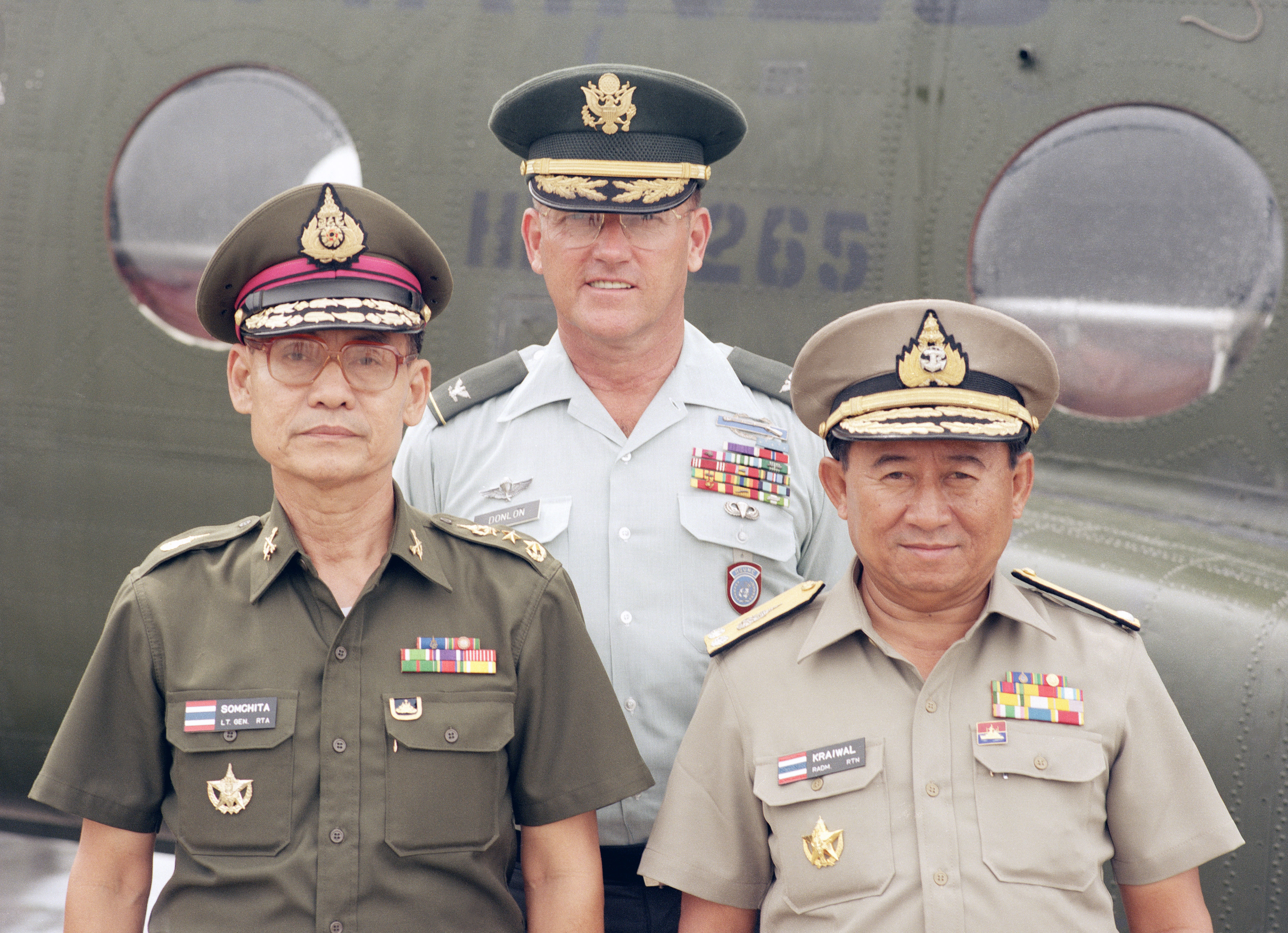
Photo of Donlon with Thai generals at the island of Okinawa in 1987

Citation:

For conspicuous gallantry and intrepidity at the risk of his life above and beyond the call of duty while defending a U.S. military installation against a fierce attack by hostile forces. Capt. Donlon was serving as the commanding officer of the U.S. Army Special Forces Detachment A-726 at Camp Nam Dong when a reinforced Viet Cong battalion suddenly launched a full-scale, predawn attack on the camp. During the violent battle that ensued, lasting 5 hours and resulting in heavy casualties on both sides, Capt. Donlon directed the defense operations in the midst of an enemy barrage of mortar shells, falling grenades, and extremely heavy gunfire. Upon the initial onslaught, he swiftly marshaled his forces and ordered the removal of the needed ammunition from a blazing building. He then dashed through a hail of small arms and exploding hand grenades to abort a breach of the main gate. En route to this position he detected an enemy demolition team of 3 in the proximity of the main gate and quickly annihilated them. Although exposed to the intense grenade attack, he then succeeded in reaching a 60mm mortar position despite sustaining a severe stomach wound as he was within 5 yards of the gun pit. When he discovered that most of the men in this gunpit were also wounded, he completely disregarded his own injury, directed their withdrawal to a location 30 meters away, and again risked his life by remaining behind and covering the movement with the utmost effectiveness. Noticing that his team sergeant was unable to evacuate the gun pit he crawled toward him and, while dragging the fallen soldier out of the gunpit, an enemy mortar exploded and inflicted a wound in Capt. Donlon's left shoulder. Although suffering from multiple wounds, he carried the abandoned 60mm mortar weapon to a new location 30 meters away where he found 3 wounded defenders. After administering first aid and encouragement to these men, he left the weapon with them, headed toward another position, and retrieved a 57mm recoilless rifle. Then with great courage and coolness under fire, he returned to the abandoned gun pit, evacuated ammunition for the 2 weapons, and while crawling and dragging the urgently needed ammunition, received a third wound on his leg by an enemy hand grenade. Despite his critical physical condition, he again crawled 175 meters to an 81mm mortar position and directed firing operations which protected the seriously threatened east sector of the camp. He then moved to an eastern 60mm mortar position and upon determining that the vicious enemy assault had weakened, crawled back to the gun pit with the 60mm mortar, set it up for defensive operations, and turned it over to 2 defenders with minor wounds. Without hesitation, he left this sheltered position, and moved from position to position around the beleaguered perimeter while hurling hand grenades at the enemy and inspiring his men to superhuman effort. As he bravely continued to move around the perimeter, a mortar shell exploded, wounding him in the face and body. As the long awaited daylight brought defeat to the enemy forces and their retreat back to the jungle leaving behind 54 of their dead, many weapons, and grenades, Capt. Donlon immediately reorganized his defenses and administered first aid to the wounded. His dynamic leadership, fortitude, and valiant efforts inspired not only the American personnel but the friendly Vietnamese defenders as well and resulted in the successful defense of the camp. Capt. Donlon's extraordinary heroism, at the risk of his life above and beyond the call of duty are in the highest traditions of the U.S. Army and reflect great credit upon himself and the Armed Forces of his country.

== Awards and decorations ==
Donlon's military awards include:

Combat Infantry Badge
South Vietnam Parachutist badge
Medal of Honor
Legion of Merit
Bronze Star Medal
Purple Heart
Meritorious Service Medal with one bronze oak leaf clusters
Joint Service Commendation Medal
Army Commendation Medal with two bronze oak leaf clusters
Army Good Conduct Medal
National Defense Service Medal with one bronze oak leaf clusters
Vietnam Service Medal with two bronze service star
Army Service Ribbon
Army Overseas Service

Unit Awards

Army Presidential Unit Citation with one bronze oak leaf clusters

Foreign decorations and awards

Officer of the National Order of Vietnam
Gallantry Cross with Palm
Vietnam Campaign Medal

== See also ==
- List of Medal of Honor recipients for the Vietnam War
