= The Green Berets (film) =

1968 film by John Wayne, Ray Kellogg

- Theatrical release poster by Frank McCarthy
- Directed by: John Wayne; Ray Kellogg
- Screenplay by: James Lee Barrett
- Based on: The Green Berets; 1965 novel by Robin Moore
- Produced by: Michael Wayne
- Starring: John Wayne; David Janssen; Jim Hutton; Aldo Ray; Raymond St. Jacques; Bruce Cabot; Patrick Wayne; Luke Askew
- Cinematography: Winton C. Hoch
- Edited by: Otho Lovering
- Music by: Miklós Rózsa
- Color process: Technicolor
- Production company: Batjac Productions
- Distributed by: Warner Bros.-Seven Arts
- Release date: June 19, 1968 (New York City)
- Running time: 142 minutes
- Country: United States
- Languages: English; Vietnamese
- Budget: $7 million
- Box office: $32 million

The Green Berets is a 1968 American war film directed by John Wayne and Ray Kellogg, and starring Wayne, David Janssen and Jim Hutton, based on the 1965 novel by Robin Moore. Much of the film was shot in the summer of 1967. Parts of the screenplay bear little relation to the novel, although the portion in which a woman seduces a North Vietnamese communist general and sets him up to be kidnapped by Americans is from the book.

The Green Berets is strongly anti-communist and pro-South Vietnam. It was released at the height of American involvement in the Vietnam War, the same year as the Tet Offensive against the largest cities in South Vietnam. John Wayne was so concerned by the anti-war sentiment in the United States, he wanted to make this film to present the pro-military position. He requested and obtained full military cooperation and materiel from President Lyndon B. Johnson and the United States Department of Defense. John Wayne bought the film rights to Robin Moore's book for $35,000 and 5% of undefined profits of the film.

The film was a financial success at the box office, but received almost universally negative reviews from critics.

== Plot ==
Reporter George Beckworth attends a Special Forces briefing about the reasons for American military involvement in the Vietnam War. When Beckworth doubts the value of U.S. intervention, Green Beret Colonel Mike Kirby asks him if he has ever been to Vietnam, which influences him to report on events there.

Meanwhile, Kirby is assigned to assist the South Vietnamese forces. As he prepares to depart, he catches Sgt. Petersen appropriating supplies, but decides to utilise his skills on his team. Arriving in South Vietnam, they meet Beckworth, whom Kirby allows to accompany them to their camp. Despite signs of humanitarian work, he remains unconvinced of the need to be in Vietnam.

At the camp, they meet a young war-orphan, Ham Chuck, whose family was slaughtered. Ham Chuck, along with his dog Jamoke, takes a liking to Sgt. Petersen. Petersen takes him in as if he were his own son.

Following an enemy attack, M/Sgt. Muldoon notices a South Vietnamese soldier acting suspiciously and knocks him out, allowing South Vietnamese Captain Nghiem to interrogate him. After Beckworth sees Nghiem torture a confession from the soldier, he confronts Kirby, who justifies the act by telling Beckworth that their enemies are ruthless killers who deserve no legal protections of any sort in this new kind of war.

A few days later, while accompanying Kirby and his team on a patrol in the nearby mountains, Beckworth finds that the granddaughter of a village chief he had befriended earlier has been tortured and executed by the Viet Cong for cooperating with the Americans.

The next night, Viet Cong and North Vietnamese troops launch a massive attack on the camp, and Beckworth is forced to fight alongside the Green Berets; he also helps move villagers into the camp to protect them from the crossfire.

Eventually, enemy sappers breach the perimeter by blowing openings in the barbed wire fences around the camp, and the Green Berets and South Vietnamese are forced to fall back to the inner perimeter. Nghiem sets off hidden explosives which kill the spies, but soon dies afterwards after being hit by a mortar.

Due to the intense attack, Kirby orders a retreat from the camp, and U.S. helicopters arrive to evacuate the refugees. Petersen puts Ham Chuck on one and promises to return for him in Da Nang. With the base in enemy hands, Kirby requests an airstrike by an AC-47 gunship, callsign Puff the Magic Dragon, which annihilates the Viet Cong guerrillas and North Vietnamese Army regulars within Camp A-107. With the enemy having taken major casualties, Kirby and his team re-occupy the destroyed camp.

Beckworth tells Kirby he will file a story supporting U.S. involvement in the war and returns to Da Nang. Back at headquarters, Kirby meets with his superior, Colonel Morgan, and his South Vietnamese counterpart, Colonel Cai. They tell him about a top secret mission to capture North Vietnamese General Pha Son Ti, allowing them to end the war on South Vietnamese terms, as well as disrupting enemy leadership. Colonel Cai uses his sister-in-law Lin, a fashion model, as a honey trap to lure General Ti to a former French colonial mansion in a well-guarded valley in North Vietnam.

Among those Cai selects (and accompanies) are Kirby, Muldoon, and Petersen. Muldoon, T/Sgt. "Doc" McGee, and two of Cai's men stay behind at a bridge over a river to set explosives to blow it up to stop pursuit by the enemy forces, while Kirby and the rest of the team head towards the plantation. After eliminating the plantation's guards, the group subdue Ti with Lin's help, and put him in the trunk of his car. Kirby, Cai, Petersen, Sgt. Watson, and Lin drive away, but the rest of the team is killed by the guards while attempting to escape.

At dawn, the survivors cross the bridge; it is destroyed, but McGee is seriously wounded as he and Muldoon escape, while the others airlift Ti out of the area by a Skyhook device. While Kirby and the team advance through the jungle to their extraction point, Petersen is killed by a booby-trap, and the others are forced to leave his body behind.

At Da Nang, Beckworth watches as Ham Chuck runs from helicopter to helicopter, desperately searching for Petersen. Eventually, Kirby tells him of Petersen's death and comforts him, before the two walk along the beach into the sunset.

== Cast ==
- John Wayne as Colonel Mike Kirby
- David Janssen as George Beckworth
- Jim Hutton as Sergeant Petersen
- Aldo Ray as Master Sergeant Muldoon
- Raymond St. Jacques as Technical Sergeant "Doc" McGee
- Bruce Cabot as Colonel Morgan
- Jack Soo as Colonel Cai
- George Takei as Captain Nghiem
- Patrick Wayne as Lieutenant Jamison
- Luke Askew as Sergeant Provo
- Irene Tsu as Lin
- Edward Faulkner as Captain MacDaniel
- Jason Evers as Captain Coleman
- Mike Henry as Sergeant Kowalski
- Craig Jue as Hamchuck
- Chuck Roberson as Technical Sergeant Griffin
- Eddy Donno as Sergeant Watson
- Richard "Cactus" Pryor as Collier

The film was notable in its casting of George Takei, who was then a regular cast member on the series Star Trek. As a result of Takei joining the film's cast, he missed filming nearly a third of the episodes of Star Trek season 2. His lines were subsequently rewritten for the character of Pavel Chekov, played by actor Walter Koenig. Koenig, who was originally cast as a rarely speaking background character, grew into one of the major Star Trek leads due to Takei's absence, leading to Chekov becoming a regular character in both the original series and subsequent films.

== Production ==
=== Pre-production ===
Columbia Pictures, having bought the book's pre-publication film rights, was not able to produce a script that the Army would approve, while producer David L. Wolper, who also tried to buy the same rights, could not obtain financing to make the movie. A screenplay was written by George Goodman who had served with the Special Forces in the 1950s as a military intelligence officer and had written a 1961 article about the Special Forces called The Unconventional Warriors in Esquire magazine. Columbia sent Goodman to South Vietnam for research. Robin Moore felt the Pentagon pressured Wolper into breaking an agreement with Moore. Wolper acquired the rights to film The Devil's Brigade, an account of the World War II 1st Special Service Force, in 1965 and produced that film instead.

The final film's origins began in June 1966 with a trip by John Wayne to South Vietnam, and his subsequent decision to produce a film about the Army special forces deployed there as a tribute to them. Wayne was a steadfast supporter of American involvement in the war in Vietnam. He co-directed the film, and turned down the "Major Reisman" role in The Dirty Dozen to do so.

=== Screenplay ===
Although The Green Berets portrays the Viet Cong and North Vietnamese Army as sadistic tyrants, it also depicts them as a capable and highly motivated enemy. The film shows the war as one with no front lines, meaning that the enemy can show up and attack at almost any position, anywhere. It shows the sophisticated spy ring of the VC and NVA that provided information about their adversaries. Like A Yank in Viet-Nam, it gave a positive view of South Vietnam and their anti-communist allies.

The US Army had objections to James Lee Barrett's initial script. The first was that the Army wanted to show that South Vietnamese soldiers were involved in defending the base camp. That was rectified. The Army also objected to the portrayal of the raid where they kidnap a NVA general because in the original script this involved crossing the border into North Vietnam. Robin Moore has stated that while all of the other stories in his book are roman à clefs of actual Special Forces missions and incidents, the mission to capture General Ti was completely fictitious.

Wayne wished the screenplay to have more development of the characters, but Warner Bros. made it clear they wanted more action and less talk, as The Alamo was heavily criticized for having too much dialogue. Scenes shot with Vera Miles as the wife of Wayne's character were jettisoned. (However, Miles was again cast as the Duke's wife in Wayne's next film Hellfighters).

=== Filming ===
Wayne wrote a letter to President Johnson requesting military assistance in the production of the film, stating that he thought "it is extremely important that not only the people of the United States, but those all over the world, should know why it is necessary for us to be [in Vietnam]", and that a motion picture would serve this purpose, "Some day soon a motion picture will be made about Vietnam. Let’s make sure it is the kind of picture that will help our cause throughout the world". After reading the script and suggesting changes which were subsequently made, the Department of Defense decided to aid in the film's production.

Much of the film was shot in the summer of 1967 (before the Tet Offensive) at Fort Benning, Georgia. Department of Defense cooperation with the film was extensive, with the United States Army providing several UH-1 Huey attack helicopters and a C-7 Caribou light transport. The United States Air Force supplied two C-130 Hercules transports and two A-1 Skyraider attack aircraft as well as film footage of an AC-47 Puff the Magic Dragon gunship and an HC-130 Hercules employing the Skyhook Fulton recovery system for use in the film. The Army also provided authentic uniforms for use by the actors, including the OG-107 green and "Tiger Stripe" tropical combat uniform (jungle fatigues), with correct Vietnam War subdued insignia and name tapes.

John F. Schultz played pivotal roles as an extra as a U.S. soldier and a North Vietnamese Regular. He said of John Wayne, "At lunch, the producers were going to feed us peons hamburgers and hotdogs while the main characters ate steak. John Wayne said '...we all get steak or nobody does.'

Colonel Lamar Asbury "Bill" Welch, the actual commander of the United States Army Airborne School at Fort Benning in 1967, makes a brief cameo Skeet Shooting with John Wayne. Welch wears a 1960s US Army Fatigue Baseball Cap (common issue during the Vietnam War) in the scene while the actors wear green berets. Soldiers exercising on the drill field – that Wayne shouts to – were actual Army airborne recruits in training.

The film's large set-piece battle is loosely based on the Battle of Nam Dong on 5–6 July 1964 when two Viet Cong battalions and the PAVN attacked a CIDG camp at Nam Dong near the Laotian border in South Vietnam's Central Highlands. For five hours, a mixed force of Americans, Australians and South Vietnamese troops fought off a force three times its size. The movie camp set, which was constructed on an isolated hill within Fort Benning, had barbed wire trenches, punji sticks, sandbagged bunkers, mortar pits, towers, support buildings and hooches. Several tons of dynamite and black powder were then used to largely destroy the set during the filming of the battle sequence. Other realistic "Vietnamese village" sets were left intact after the shooting ended so they could be reused by the Army for training troops destined for South East Asia.

It was the first of two films Jim Hutton would make with John Wayne the other being Hellfighters.

=== Music ===
The original choice for scoring the film, Elmer Bernstein, a friend and frequent collaborator with John Wayne, turned the assignment down due to his political beliefs. As a second choice, the producers contacted Miklós Rózsa then in Rome. When asked to do The Green Berets for John Wayne, Rózsa replied: "I don't do Westerns". Rózsa was told "It's not a Western, it's an 'Eastern'". As a title song, the producers used a Ken Darby choral arrangement of Barry Sadler's 1966 hit song "The Ballad of the Green Berets," which had been co-written by Robin Moore, author of the original Green Berets novel. Rózsa provided a strong and varied musical score including a night club vocal by a Vietnamese singer Bạch Yến; however, bits of "Onward Christian Soldiers" were deleted from the final film.

== Reception ==
=== Critical reception ===
Upon its cinema release, movie critic Roger Ebert gave it zero stars and cited extensive use of cliches, depicting the war in terms of "cowboys and Indians", and being a "heavy-handed, remarkably old-fashioned film." It is on his "Most Hated" list. His then-rival at the Chicago Tribune, Clifford Terry, described the film as "both predictable and tedious" and added that its "most fatal mistake" was "presenting the United States' most complex war in the simplest of terms."

The San Francisco Examiner's critic, Stanley Eichelbaum, observed the film thus:

John Wayne—bless him—has convinced me he's more of a patriot than he thinks. His movie, The Green Berets, which opened yesterday at the St. Francis, Coliseum, El Rey and Geneva Drive-In, will without question unite the doves and the hawks. It is the first film about Vietnam about which there can be no controversy, no dispute, no argument. Nobody who sees it will find a single reason to disagree that it is the phoniest, most laughable war picture in many years.

Reviewing for The New York Times, Renata Adler wrote, "The Green Berets is a film so unspeakable, so stupid, so rotten and false in every detail that it passes through being fun, through being funny, through being camp, through everything and becomes an invitation to grieve, not for our soldiers or for Vietnam (the film could not be more false or do a greater disservice to either of them), but for what has happened to the fantasy-making apparatus in this country."

Leonard Maltin in his Movie Guide gave it a "BOMB" rating (his lowest score), saying: "Politics aside, this overlong, incredibly cliched salute to the Special Forces has enough absurd situations and unfunny comedy relief to offend anyone; don't miss [the] now-famous final scene, where the sun sets in the East."

The screenplay for Oliver Stone's anti-war film Platoon was written partially as a reaction to The Green Berets. It is mocked in the Gustav Hasford novel The Short-Timers in a scene where Joker and Rafter Man find the Lusthog Squad watching it at a movie theater. "The audience of Marines roars with laughter. This is the funniest movie we have seen in a long time."

John Pilger, a strong critic of American foreign policy, described his reaction to The Green Berets in a 2007 speech he gave criticising the media for its coverage of the Vietnam War. "I had just come back from Vietnam, and I couldn't believe how absurd this movie was. So I laughed out loud, and I laughed and laughed. And it wasn't long before the atmosphere around me grew very cold. My companion, who had been a Freedom Rider in the South, said, 'Let's get the hell out of here and run like hell.'"

Film commentator Emanuel Levy noted in his retrospective review that Wayne was not attempting to promote the cause of the Vietnam War as much as he was trying to portray the Special Forces in their unique role in the military: "Wayne said his motive was to glorify American soldiers as the finest fighting men 'without going into why we are there, or if they should be there.' His 'compulsion' to do the movie was based on his pride of the Special Forces, determined to show 'what a magnificent job this still little-known branch of service is doing.' ... 'I wasn't trying to send a message out to anybody,' he reasoned, 'or debating whether it is right or wrong for the United States to be in this war.'"

“I did see The Green Berets while I was in Vietnam. It was shown at a theater in Da Nang that was full of marines and had about a dozen Green Berets sitting in one row - they were really shat upon by the rest of the audience; you would have thought you were watching a comedy from the laughter of the marines.” - Vietnam War correspondent and combat veteran Michael Herr.

Levy also notes that Wayne acknowledged that war is generally not popular, but the soldiers who serve face the risks and dangers of combat nonetheless, and must be prepared to sacrifice themselves, regardless of their personal will or judgment. Levy quotes Wayne: "What war was ever popular for God's sake? Those men don't want to be in Vietnam any more than anyone else. Once you go over there, you won't be middle-of-the-road."

In 2003, Richard Roeper, who was then the co-host of At the Movies with Roger Ebert, put The Green Berets on his list of his forty least favorite films of all time to that point. He called it "Shameless propaganda [that l]ooks like it was produced by the Department of Defense and directed by Barry Goldwater."

The Green Berets holds a 23% rating on Rotten Tomatoes based on thirteen reviews.

=== Box office ===
Despite the poor reviews, and despite being protested and picketed in the United States and abroad, it went on to be a commercial success, which Wayne attributed in part to the negative reviews from the press, which he saw as representing criticism of the war rather than the film.

"The critics overkilled me, the picture and the war", said Wayne. "As a result, so many people went to see it that I had a cheque from the distributors for $8 million within three months. That's the cost of the picture, so we moved into profit the next day." The Green Berets earned rentals of $8.7 million in North America during 1968.

=== Accolades ===
The film is recognized by American Film Institute in the following:

- 2005: AFI's 100 Years...100 Movie Quotes:
  - Col. Mike Kirby: "Out here, due process is a bullet." — Nominated

== See also ==
- List of American films of 1968
- John Wayne filmography
- List of film director and actor collaborations

== Sources ==
- Herr, Michael. 1977. Dispatches. Everyman's Library, New York/Toronto. ISBN 978-0-307-27080-1
- Schroeder, Eric James. 1989. "Interview with Michael Herr: ‘We've All Been There.’” Writing on the Edge, Fall, 1989, Vol. 1, No. 1 (Fall, 1989), pp. 39–54 Published by: Regents of the University of California, on behalf of its Davis University Writing Program Stable https://www.jstor.org/stable/43158633 Accessed 26 July 2025.
