= Battle of Nam Dong =

Part of the Vietnam War (1964)

- Part of the Vietnam War
Date	6 July 1964
Location	Nam Đông, Quảng Nam Province, South Vietnam 16.1175°N 107.678°E
Result	South Vietnam and United States victory

Belligerents
South Vietnam; United States; Australia	Viet Cong; North Vietnam

Commanders and leaders
(United States) Roger H. C. Donlon (U.S. A-726 commander)	(South Vietnam) Captain Lich (Camp Commander)

Strength
(South Vietnam) 360 ARVN/CIDG (United States) 12 Green Berets (Australia) 1 Advisor	~800–900 guerrillas

Casualties and losses
(South Vietnam) 58 killed (United States) 2 killed (Australia) 1 killed	55 killed

The battle of Nam Đông took place from July 5–6, 1964 during the Vietnam War, when the Viet Cong (VC) and People's Army of Vietnam (PAVN) attacked the Nam Đông CIDG camp in an attempt to overrun it. During the battle, 57 South Vietnamese defenders, two Americans, an Australian military advisor, and at least 62 attackers were killed.

== Background ==
Nam Đông is situated 32 miles (51 km) west of Da Nang in a valley near the Laotian border; it was manned by South Vietnamese personnel with American and Australian advisers, and served as a major thorn in the side of local VC militants.

The camp housed 381 men - 311 Montagnard Strikers, 50 Nung bodyguards, an Australian Army Training Team Vietnam (AATTV) adviser, and seven Vietnamese and 12 U.S. Special Forces soldiers. On 5 July, the VC executed two chiefs of neighboring villages. The populace seemed agitated, but no one came forward with information, and the camp, which lacked an intelligence net, could learn nothing of the VC's intentions. Nam Dong was particularly vulnerable. The people were indifferent and the fortifications poorly constructed. To make matters worse, the occupants had allowed the defenses to deteriorate because the allies had decided to close the camp. Tall grass grew up to the perimeter wire. Nor was all well inside. The Nungs and Montagnards disliked each other, and on 5 July, a fistfight broke out between the two groups over a prostitute. Soon, the two sides were shooting at each other. The commander of Detachment A–726, Captain Roger Donlon, threatened to kill his counterpart, Captain Lich, to get him to restore order.

The camp's only saving grace was that the US had built it around an old French fort. The Americans lived in the fort, and the CIDG soldiers occupied the surrounding camp. As night approached, tensions both inside and outside the post led Donlon to increase the number of guards and to stock the fighting positions with extra ammunition. The Nungs were also on high alert, as much out of fear of a night assault by the Strikers as by the insurgents. Captain Lich chose not to send out any security patrols.

== Battle ==
At 02:30 on 6 July, four mortars and a 75mm recoilless rifle opened fire on the camp. The preliminary bombardment lasted 15 minutes. White phosphorus shells set many buildings ablaze. A radio operator was able to alert higher headquarters before a shell destroyed the radio shack. Donlon spotted three sappers planting demolition charges by the gate. He charged through a hail of gunfire and killed them before they could detonate the charges. His actions could not stop approximately two PAVN/VC battalions from sweeping over the perimeter from several directions. Many of the attackers sported new weapons and uniforms. More than 100 Strikers defected and joined the attackers. It was not long before the PAVN/VC controlled most of the camp, leaving the French fort with its American and Nung defenders as the last major point of resistance. Over the next two hours, the men in the fort repulsed three massed assaults.

When Nam Dong's distress signal reached higher headquarters, U.S. officers scrambled to organize a relief effort. That was easier said than done. Neither U.S. Marine Corps helicopters nor Republic of Vietnam Air Force (RVNAF) fighters could operate without illumination, and a flare ship was not immediately available. A forward air control aircraft and two RVNAF fighter-bombers arrived, but they were unable to contact the troops on the ground and they declined to strike. Meanwhile, the district chief assembled two Regional Forces companies, but he refused to advance in fear of an ambush.

The arrival of a flare ship at 04:00 dampened the enemy’s ardor. The assaults on the fort stopped, and the firing slackened. The PAVN/VC used a loudspeaker to call for the defenders to surrender. The appeal was short-lived. Seeing that six PAVN/VC were trying to capture an 81mm mortar, SFC Thurman Brown charged and killed them. He then directed the CIDG crew to fire in the direction of the loudspeaker, knocking it out. Brown then rushed a 60mm mortar the PAVN/VC had captured, killing or wounding its five crewmen.

At 06:00 six HMM-162 helicopters carrying reinforcements escorted by two U.S. Army UH-1B helicopter gunships left Da Nang Air Base for Nam Dong, but on arriving over the camp they were unable to land due to intense fire and had to return to Da Nang.

A U.S. Army CV-2 Caribou managed to drop ammunition into the camp and Republic of Vietnam Air Force (RVNAF) A-1 Skyraiders carried out airstrikes on the PAVN/VC around the camp.

As dawn broke, the PAVN/VC retreated into the surrounding forest. The fight had lasted five hours.

At 09:45 18 HMM-162 UH-34Ds escorted by four UH-1Bs and two RVNAF A-1s began landing a 93 man relief force and extracting the wounded. At 15:45 a further flight of 10 UH-34s delivered ammunition and equipment to the camp, but by this time the battle was over.

== Aftermath ==
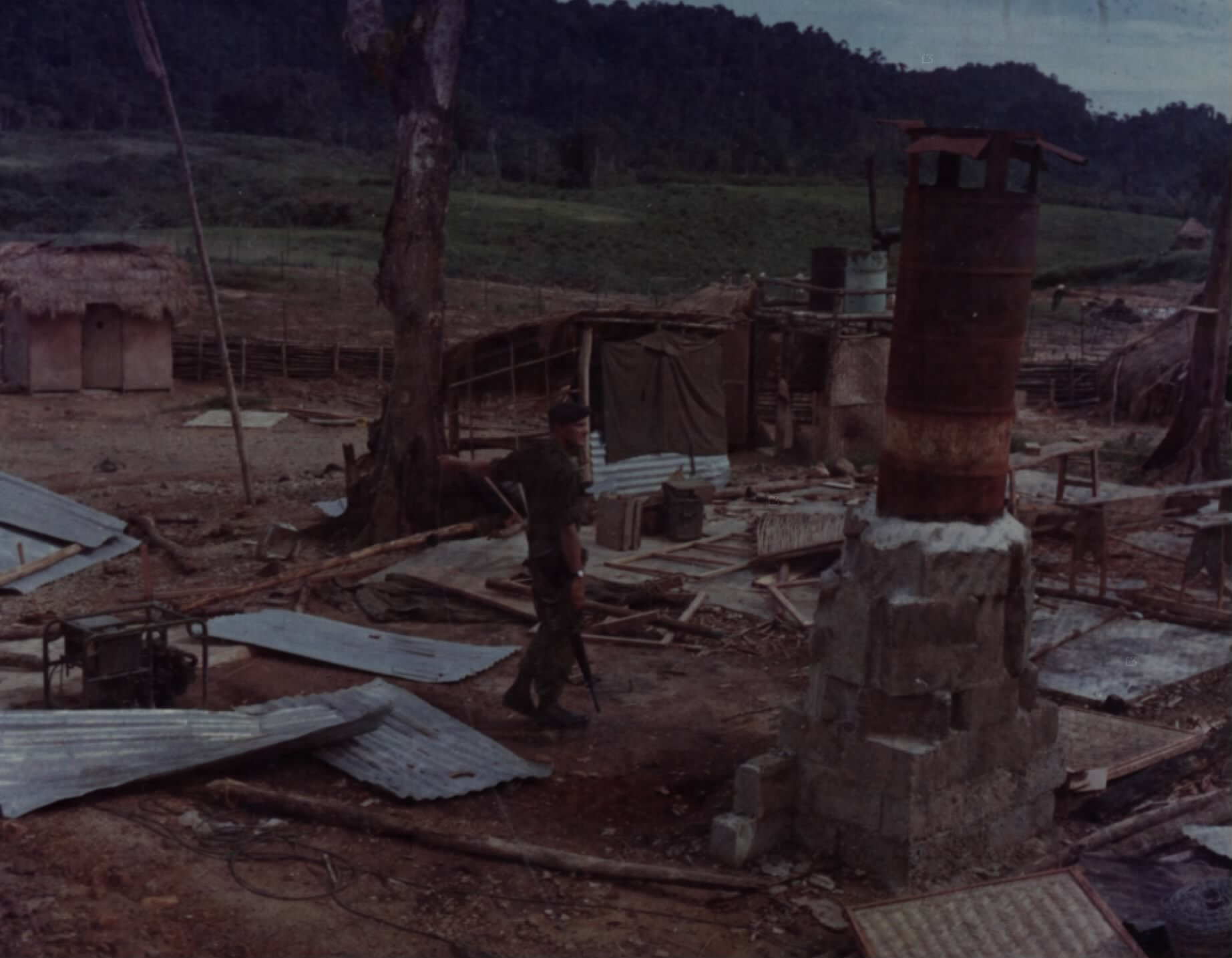
Captain Roger Donlon returns to Nam Dong, 21 September 1964

Allied losses were two U.S., one Australian and 58 Montagnard/Nungs killed, 57 wounded and more than 100 defected. The PAVN/VC left 55 dead around the camp.

The allies closed Nam Dong and moved the troops to a new location, Ta Co, closer to the border.

The identity of the attacking units remained a mystery. Colonel Ted Serong and a U.S. civilian who happened to be at Nam Dong during the battle, Gerald Hickey, believed the attackers were North Vietnamese regulars. MACV remained unconvinced, and PAVN histories are silent on the matter.

Donlon became the first American to be awarded the Medal of Honor in Vietnam for killing two VC sappers and thereby preventing them from breaching the Nam Dong base, while sustaining shrapnel wounds in the process.

AATTV Warrant Officer Kevin Conway was killed in the assault. He was the first Australian to be killed in action in the Vietnam War. Master Sergeant Gabriel Alamo and Sergeant John L. Houston were also killed during the action on 6 July 1964. Alamo and Houston were posthumously awarded the Distinguished Service Cross. Sergeant Terrance D. Terrin, U.S. Army Green Beret medic, was awarded the Silver Star for his gallantry in the battle.

== The Green Berets ==
A battle scene in the 1968 film The Green Berets was inspired by the battle of Nam Dong.

== See also ==
- Viet Cong and PAVN strategy and tactics
- Battle of Wanat - U.S. forces repel insurgents from small outpost in 2008 battle in Afghanistan
- Battle for Hill 3234 - Soviet paratroopers repel Afghan insurgent forces dramatized in the 2005 movie The 9th Company.
