= William Wells (minister) =

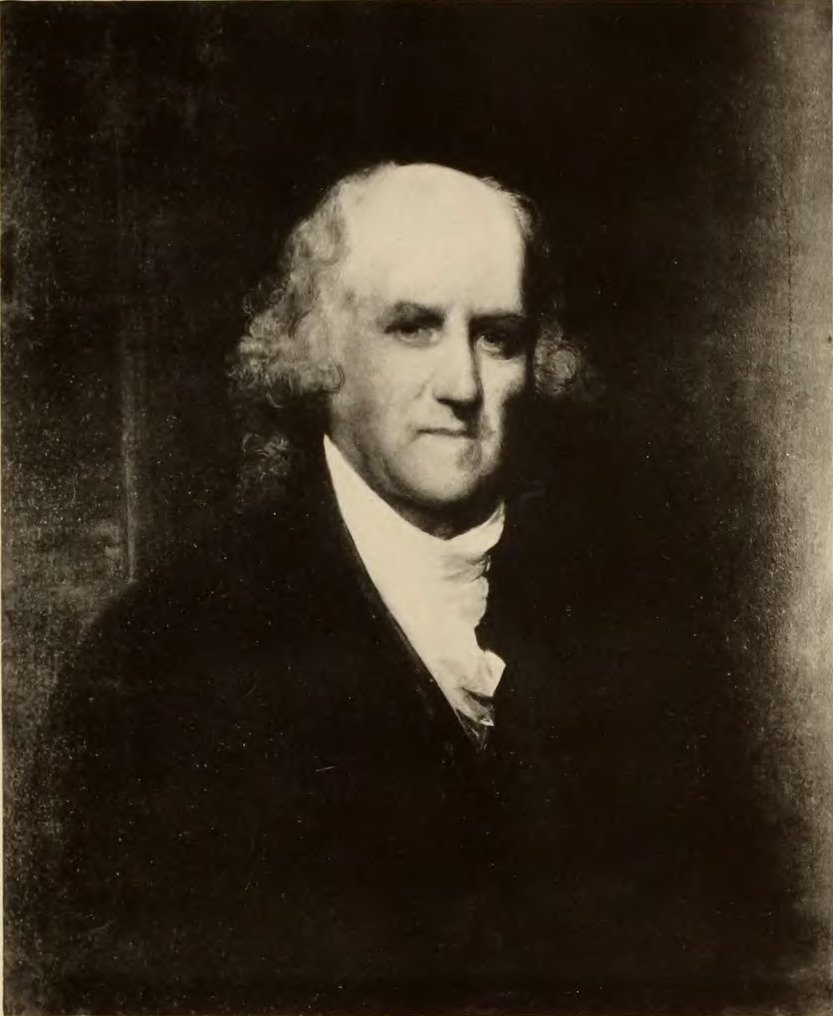
- portrait by Gilbert Stuart
- Born: 1744
- Died: 27 December 1827 (aged 82–83)

William Wells (1744 – 27 December 1827) was a minister and farmer at Bromsgrove, Worcestershire, and at Brattleboro, Vermont.

William Wells was born at Biggleswade. He was orphaned when young, cared for by an uncle, Ebenezer Custerson a farmer at Cardington, Bedfordshire, and educated by Rev Samuel Sanderson (1702–66) at Bedford. He studied under Caleb Ashworth at Daventry Academy, 1765–70, a fellow student with Thomas Belsham. He was appointed minister at Bromsgrove Presbyterian Chapel in 1770, where he remained until 1793. In January 1771 he married Jane Hancox of Dudley.

In the troubles which preceded American Independence, he took a strong interest in favour of the Colonies, taking an active part with Richard Price, Thomas Wren of Portsmouth, in garnering subscriptions for the relief of the American prisoners. Convinced of the benefits of smallpox inoculation, he inoculated his own children, and inoculated the children of poor neighbours, who could not afford the surgeons' fee. He is said to have spent two years riding about the country, inoculating as many as thirteen hundred children.

During the Birmingham riots, his home was threatened and the meeting-house escaped only by accident. Wells had been contemplating emigration to New England since 1780. He was now resolved upon it, arriving at Boston, with his wife and eight children, 12 June 1793. He was soon joined by William Priestley, son of Dr Joseph Priestley, who stayed with the family, perhaps helping with Wells's farm. The next year, he purchased a farm at Brattleboro, Vermont, where he lived until his death. He corresponded with William Bentley and other Unitarians in New England

After a year or two, he was invited to become minister at Brattleboro, but declined a formal appointment. He agreed, however, to perform the functions of that office as 'officiating pastor', on an annual basis, being annually chosen by the town for about twenty years. While he was absent on a visit to England, in 1818, he was awarded a doctorate of divinity from Harvard University.

== Publications ==
- Wells, William; A sermon, delivered at Putney, Vermont, on the sixteenth day of November, 1797: at the funeral of the Rev. Josiah Goodhue, by the Rev. William Wells, late of Broomsgrove, England, now officiating Pastor of the Church of Christ in Brattleboro', Vermont (Putney, VT, 1798).
- Wells, William; The character of Josiah, King of Judah, considered and recommended to the imitation of young people, in two discourses, preached at Brattleboro', Vermont, A.D. 1802 (Brattleboro', VT, 1803).
- Wells, William; Some observations, taken in part from an address delivered in the new meeting-house in Brattleborough, July 7th, 1816; being the first Christian communion held in that place (Brattleboro, VT, 1816).
- Wells, William; Some communications first published in the Brattleborough paper, containing besides some other things, extracts from a pamphlet published by the Rev. Benjamin Fawcett [1715-80], entitled "Candid reflections on the different manner in which the learned and the pious have expressed their conceptions concerning the doctrine of the Trinity" (Brattleboro, VT, 1816)
- Wells, William; Eight letters from an aged minister to the young men and youth of his flock: particularly including those who have left his ministry to settle at a distance (Brattleboro, VT, 1818).
