= Tales of the Green Beret =

American war comic strip

- A 1967 Sunday page by Moore and Kubert. Set during the Vietnam War, it was published concurrent with the controversial real-life conflict.
- Author(s): Robin Moore; Howard Liss
- Illustrator(s): Joe Kubert; John Celardo
- Current status/schedule: Concluded daily & Sunday strip
- Launch date: September 20, 1965
- End date: July 21, 1968
- Syndicate(s): Chicago Tribune Syndicate
- Publisher(s): Dell Comics
- Genre(s): War

Tales of the Green Beret is an American comic strip created by the nonfiction author Robin Moore and artist Joe Kubert. Published in the 1960s, its Vietnam War setting was concurrent with the real-life conflict.

== Publication history ==
Tales of the Green Beret, by nonfiction author Robin Moore and established DC Comics war-comics artist Joe Kubert, began as a daily strip, running for 72 numbered strips starting September 20, 1965. The following year it returned daily and Sunday, beginning April 4, 1966, with scripts by Howard Liss. There were eight Kubert stories:

- 1965: Viet Cong Cowboy
- 1966: Kidnap Ksor Tonn, Sucker Bait, Chris Kidnapped, Project Oilspot
- 1967: Freedom Flight, The Syndicate, Prince Synok

Kubert left the strip in January 1968. His last Sunday was January 7, and his last daily was January 10. The strip continued until July 21, 1968 with art by John Celardo and writing by Robin Moore.

The first story was reprinted in a Signet Books paperback from The New American Library; most of the strip has been reprinted in three books from Blackthorne and in two magazines from Dragon Lady Press. Falling between the two reprint sets is most of May 1967. The last few Kubert strips, of December 31, 1967 and later, have not been reprinted, nor have any of the Celardo strips.

Tales of the Green Beret continued to be published as an American comic book by Dell Publishing from 1967 to 1969.

== See also ==
- United States Army Special Forces in popular culture
