= Robin Moore =

American writer (1925–2008)

- Born: Robert Lowell Moore Jr. October 31, 1925; Boston, Massachusetts, U.S.
- Died: February 21, 2008 (aged 82); Hopkinsville, Kentucky, U.S.
- Education: Harvard College (1949)
- Occupation: Author
- Writing career
- Genres: Fiction and non-fiction
- Subjects: Military, war

Robert Lowell Moore Jr. (October 31, 1925 – February 21, 2008) was an American writer who wrote The Green Berets, The French Connection: A True Account of Cops, Narcotics, and International Conspiracy, and with Xaviera Hollander and Yvonne Dunleavy, The Happy Hooker: My Own Story.

Moore co-authored the lyrics for "The Ballad of the Green Berets", which was one of the major hit songs of 1966. The song was featured in the 1968 film The Green Berets, based on Moore's book, which starred John Wayne. A new edition of The Green Berets was published in April 2007, and his last book, Wars of the Green Berets, co-authored with Col. Mike 'Doc' Lennon, was released in June 2007.

Moore was convicted of tax fraud in 1986. At the time of his death, he was living in Hopkinsville, Kentucky, home to Fort Campbell and the 5th Special Forces Group, where he was working on his memoirs and three other books.

== Early life and career ==
Born in Boston, Moore was the son of Robert Lowell Moore and Eleanor Turner Moore. Moore was raised in Concord, Massachusetts, where he attended Middlesex School. He also attended Belmont Hill School.

During World War II, he served as a nose gunner in the U.S. Army Air Forces, flying combat missions in the European Theater. For his service, he was awarded the Air Medal. Moore graduated from Harvard College in 1949, and one of his first jobs was working in television production and then at the Sheraton Hotel Company co-founded by his father, Robert Lowell Moore. While working in the hotel business in the Caribbean, he recorded the early days of Fidel Castro in the nonfiction book The Devil To Pay.

== Training with Special Forces ==
Due to connections with Harvard classmate Robert F. Kennedy, (Harvard class of 1948), Moore (Harvard class of 1949) was allowed access to the U.S. Army Special Forces to write about this elite unit of the United States Army. General William P. Yarborough insisted that Moore go through special forces training to better understand "what makes Special Forces soldiers 'special'." He trained for nearly a year, first at "jump school" for airborne training before completing the Special Forces Qualification Course or "Q course", becoming the first civilian to participate in such an intensive program. Afterwards, Moore was assigned to the 5th Special Forces Group on deployment to South Vietnam. His experiences in-country formed the basis for The Green Berets, a bestseller that helped secure him international acclaim (see United States Army Special Forces in popular culture).

== Later writings ==
During the 1970s and 1980s, Moore travelled widely, spending time in such places as Dubai, Iran, Rhodesia, and Russia. Having gathered the information needed, he wrote The Crippled Eagles (later published as The White Tribe) and The Moscow Connection. Due to political controversy, The Crippled Eagles was rejected by publishers and did not appear until the early 1990s. He also wrote the nonfiction books Rhodesia and Major Mike (with U.S. Army Major Mike Williams).

While researching what became The Crippled Eagles, in 1976 Moore established what he called the "Unofficial US Embassy" in Salisbury, and began hosting events for the American volunteers who were serving in the Rhodesian Security Forces as well as doctoral students. He encouraged the volunteers to call themselves 'Crippled Eagles' due to the mistaken perception that they were being harassed, or could be harassed, by their government. Moore also sold t-shirts, sew-on patches and other merchandise using the 'Crippled Eagle' motif. During the same year, he also wrote a book that argued that Rhodesia was not racist and included profiles of foreign volunteers in the country.

== Tax evasion ==
In April 1986, Moore pleaded guilty to conspiracy to defraud the United States for participating in a scheme involving means of roughly $37 million in literary tax shelters which generated fraudulent tax losses for over 1,000 individual U.S. taxpayers involving paperback books whose value had been artificially inflated, thus facilitating claims for false depreciation deductions and tax credits. He was sentenced to five years of probation fined $500, and ordered to serve 300 hours of community service.

== Uzbekistan and Iraq ==
Moore travelled to Uzbekistan in December 2001 to research the CIA-Northern Alliance war against the Taliban and al-Qaeda, publishing the account in the bestseller The Hunt for Bin Laden.

In 2003, continuing his interest in writing about the war on terror, Moore traveled to Iraq to research Operation Iraqi Freedom and the downfall of the Saddam Hussein regime for his book, Hunting Down Saddam. Before his death, he completed The Singleton: Target Cuba with Ret. USASF Major General Geoffrey Lambert, a novel about Fidel Castro and biological warfare.

== The Hunt For Bin Laden veracity ==
Shortly after the publication of The Hunt for Bin Laden, the veracity of the book was disputed, particularly regarding the involvement of Jack Idema. Idema, who was one of Moore's major sources, provided what later proved to be fabricated accounts of his exploits. To portray himself as having a greater role in the operation, Idema apparently went as far as to rewrite much of Moore and Chris Thompson's text prior to publication under the direct authorization of Random House editor Bob Loomis. Special Forces soldiers who were on the mission (including those whom Moore interviewed) disputed Idema's claims.

With Idema thus discredited, Moore eventually disavowed The Hunt for Bin Laden and the book remains out of print. Despite the dispute over the book's veracity, Moore continued to enjoy the respect of the Special Forces community.

== Other works ==
=== Film ===
The Green Berets is a 1968 film based on Moore's 1965 book. Parts of the screenplay bear little relation to the novel, although the portion in which a woman seduces a Vietnamese communist leader and sets him up to be kidnapped by Americans is from the book. John Wayne requested and obtained full military co-operation and materiel from President Johnson. To please the Pentagon, which was attempting to prosecute Robin Moore for revealing classified information, Wayne bought Moore out for $35,000 and 5% of undefined profits of the film.

=== Other ===
- Creator of the comic strip Tales of the Green Beret and the book The Man with the Silver Oar
- Co-screenwriter for the film Inchon about the Inchon landing during the Korean War
- Co-founder of the Crippled Eagles club in Rhodesia (now Zimbabwe) for expatriate Americans serving with the Rhodesian Security Forces

== Honors ==
At the 2007 5th Special Forces Group reunion banquet, Col. Chris Conner confirmed Moore as a lifelong member of 5th SFG. At the same banquet, Moore was made a Kentucky colonel.

== Death and burial ==
Robin Moore died in Hopkinsville, Kentucky, on February 21, 2008, after a long illness. A memorial service was held in the First Presbyterian Church in Hopkinsville, Kentucky. Eulogies were given by Major General Victor J. Hugo Jr., Major General Thomas R. Csrnko, Alexander N. Rossolimo, and Moore's brother John. A Presidential citation was presented to Helen Moore by General Hugo. Full military honors were rendered immediately after the service by a complement of 5th Group Special Forces soldiers from Fort Campbell.

Moore was cremated and his remains were interred in Sleepy Hollow Cemetery (Concord, Massachusetts) with full military honors rendered again by a complement of Special Forces soldiers from the 5th Group of Fort Campbell and this time the Concord Independent Battery delivered gun salutes. This was followed by a sounding of Echo Taps.

Major General Gary L. Harrell, deputy commanding general of the United States Special Operations Command, issued this statement in praise of Moore:

All Special Forces Soldiers, past and present, mourn the passing of Robin Moore; he was a valued and trusted member of the Special Operations family. Robin was a devoted advocate and a true Ambassador for the "Green Beret" and all they stand for. His writings on Special Forces are textbooks for our modern Unconventional Warriors; they were both educational and inspirational and introduced the world to the "Green Berets." He will be missed.

== Bibliography ==
- The Devil To Pay (1961) (ISBN 1-879915-02-2)
- The Green Berets (1965) (ISBN 0-312-98492-8)
- Pitchman (1966)
- The French Connection: A True Account of Cops, Narcotics, and International Conspiracy (1969) (ISBN 1-59228-044-7)
- The Country Team (1970)
- The Happy Hooker: My Own Story (with Xaviera Hollander) (1971) (ISBN 0-06-001416-4)
- The Khaki Mafia (1971) (with June Collins)
- Court Martial (1972) (with Henry Rothblatt)
- The Fifth Estate (1973)
- Adventures of a Treasure Hunter (1973) (with Howard Jennings)
- The Family Man (1974) (with Milt Machlin)
- The London Switch (1974) (with Al Dempsey)
- The Italian Connection (1975) (with Al Dempsey)
- The Set Up: The Shocking Aftermath To The French Connection (1975) (with Milt Machlin)
- Hotel Tomayne (1976)
- The Season (1976) (with Patricia Hornung)
- Dubai (1976)
- The Pearl Harbor Cover-Up (1976) (with Frank Schuler)
- The Terminal Connection (1976)
- The Kaufman Snatch (1976)
- Valency Girl (1976) (with Susan Deitz)
- Phase of Darkness (1976) (with Al Dempsey)
- The Establishment (1976) (with Harold Shumate)
- The Death Disciple (1977) (with Gerald G Griffin)
- Mafia Wife (with Barbara Fuca) (1977) (ISBN 0-02-586180-8)
- Our Missile's Missing (1977) (with Stan Gebler Davies)
- Combat Pay (1977)
- The Washington Connection (1977)
- Rhodesia (1977) (ISBN 0-89516-005-6)
- The Big Paddle (1978)
- The Black Sea Caper (1978) (with Hugh McDonald)
- Chinese Ultimatum (1978) (with Edward McGhee)
- Caribbean Caper (1978)
- Death Never Forgets (1978)
- Diamond Spitfire (1978)
- The Hillside Strangler (1978) (with Robin H. Neville)
- Red Falcons (1978) (with Al Dempsey)
- The Cobra Team (1978) (with Edward E Mayer)
- The Last Coming (1978) (with Gerald G Griffin)
- The Treasure Hunter (1979) (with Howard Jennings)
- The New York Connection (1979)
- Search and Destroy (1980) (ISBN 0-89516-048-X)
- Only the Hyenas Laughed (1980) (with Neville H Romain)
- The Gold Connection (1980) (with Julian Askin)
- Compulsion (1981)
- London Connection (1981) (with Al Dempsey)
- Fast Shuffle (1981) (with Sidney Levine)
- Black Sea Connection (1981) (with Hugh McDonald)
- The Tales of Green Beret (1985)
- Force Nine (1986)
- The Man Who Made It Snow (1990) (with Richard Smitten and Max Mermelstein)
- The White Tribe (1991) (with Barbara Fuca)
- The Moscow Connection (1994)
- The Sparrowhook Curse (1996)
- The Accidental Pope (2000) (with Ray Flynn)
- The Hunt for Bin Laden: Task Force Dagger (2003)
- Hunting Down Saddam – The inside story of the search and capture (2004) (ISBN 0-312-32916-4)
- React: CIA Black Ops (2004) (with Chuck Lightfoot)
- The Singleton: Target Cuba (2004) (and Jeff Lambert)
- The Wars of the Green Berets (2007) (and Michael Lennon) (ISBN 1-60239-054-1)
