= The Green Berets (book) =

Book by Robin Moore

- First edition
- Author: Robin Moore
- Language: English
- Genre: Fiction
- Publisher: Crown Publishing Group
- Publication date: 1965
- Publication place: United States
- Media type: Print (hardback and paperback)
- Pages: 341
- ISBN: 0-312-98492-8
- OCLC: 410863

The Green Berets is a book (ISBN 0-312-98492-8) written by Robin Moore about the Green Berets during the Vietnam War. First published in 1965, it became a best-selling paperback in 1966. The latest edition was published in 2016.

== Background ==
Moore, a Harvard classmate of Robert F. Kennedy, wanted to write about the United States Army Special Forces. It was Special Forces founder General William P. Yarborough who insisted that Moore go through the "Q Course" in order to better understand what made Special Forces "special." Moore trained with the soldiers at Fort Benning and Fort Bragg for nearly a year, becoming airborne qualified. He then accompanied them on a deployment to South Vietnam in 1963.

Moore's account included several controversial facts about Special Forces missions that were classified at the time, prompting Moore to publish his book as "fiction". One Special Forces officer in the opening chapter is "Captain Steve (Sven) Kornie", who was based on the Finnish expatriate Larry Thorne. The chapter depicted a fierce battle in real life when Special Forces Detachment A-734, stationed in the Tịnh Biên District, was attacked; all members of the detachment were later awarded the Purple Heart for injuries sustained in the fighting.

== Film adaptation ==
The book was adapted into a 1968 film of the same name starring John Wayne. Production included extensive cooperation from the U.S. Army, which insisted that Moore not be involved with the film. To please the Pentagon, Wayne bought Moore out for $35,000 and 5% of undefined profits of the film.

The movie version is noted for being one of the few films about Vietnam actually produced during the Vietnam War. It is set in South Vietnam but was mostly filmed in and around Fort Benning.

== See also ==
- List of bestselling novels in the United States in the 1960s
- United States Army Special Forces in popular culture
