= Sheraton Hotels and Resorts =

American hotel chain

- Type: Subsidiary
- Industry: Hospitality
- Founded: 1937; 89 years ago Springfield, Massachusetts, U.S.
- Founders: Ernest Henderson; Robert Lowell Moore
- Headquarters: Bethesda, Maryland, U.S.
- Number of locations: 431 (December 2024)
- Number of employees: 145,000
- Parent: Marriott International
- Website: sheraton.marriott.com

Sheraton Hotels and Resorts is an American international hotel chain owned by Marriott International. As of December 2024, Sheraton operates 431 hotels with 150,640 rooms globally, including locations in North America, Africa, Asia-Pacific, Central and South America, Europe, the Middle East and the Caribbean.

== History ==
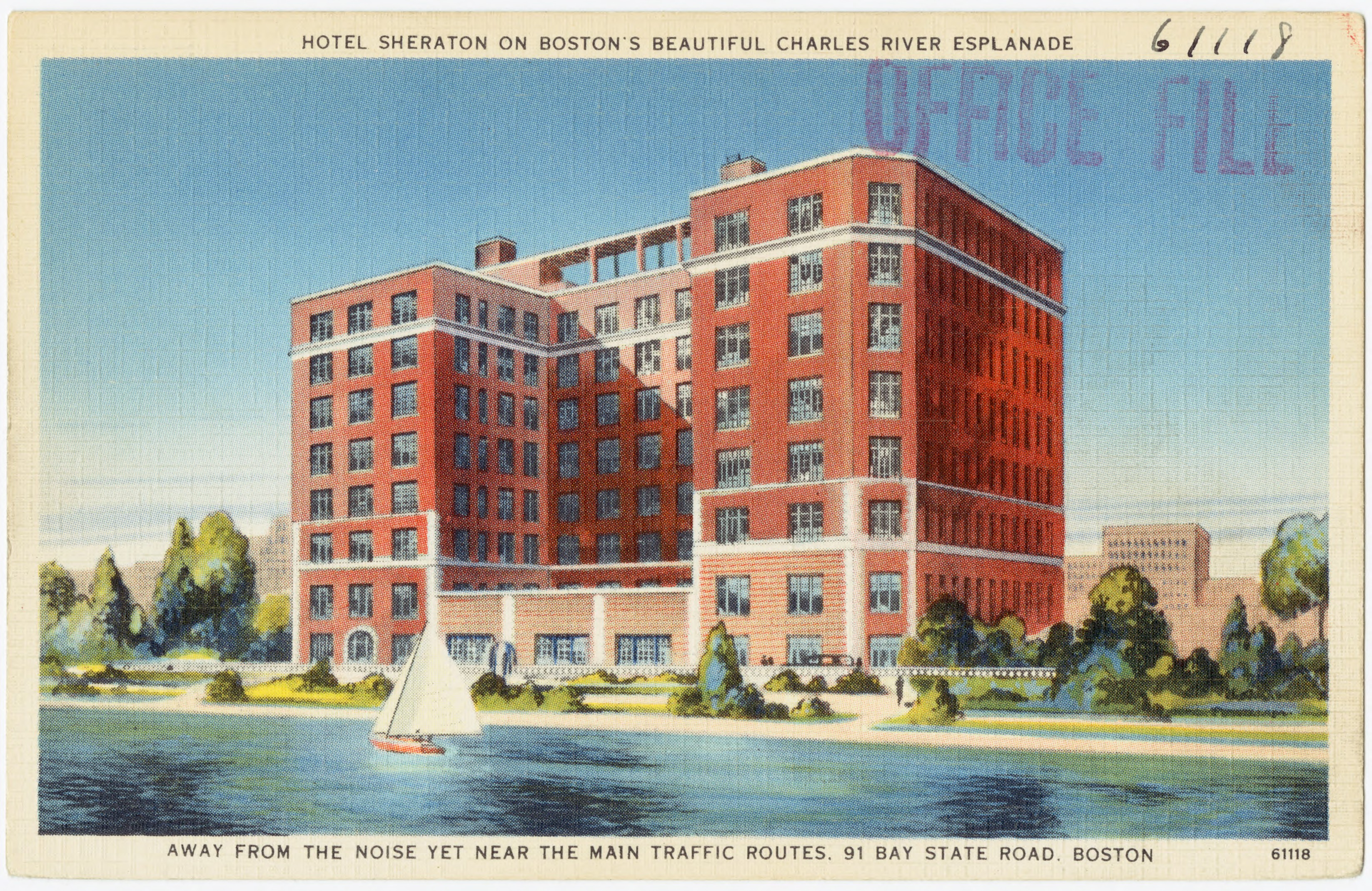
Hotel Sheraton, Boston, 1930s

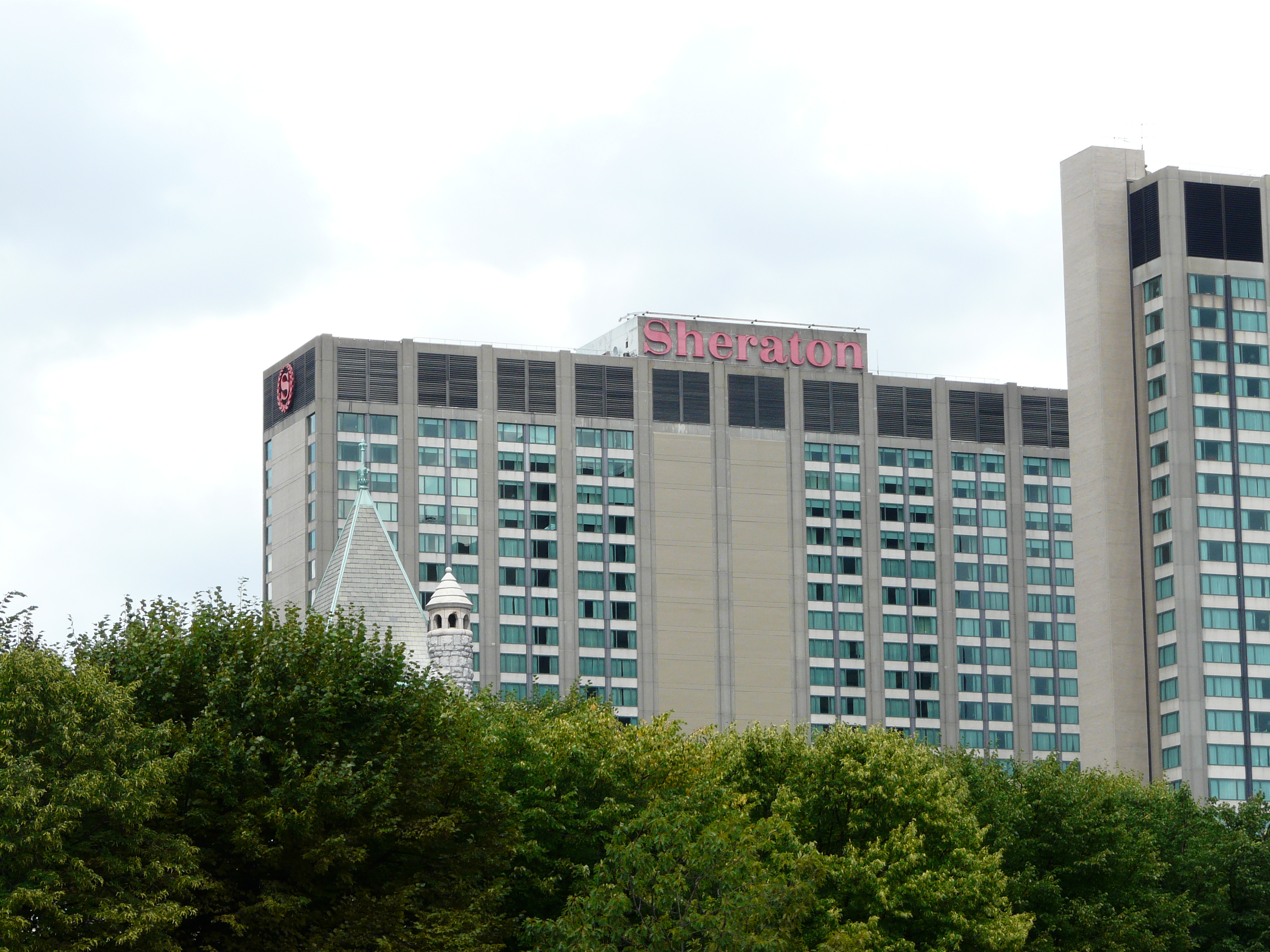
Sheraton Boston, the chain's 100th property and flagship for many years

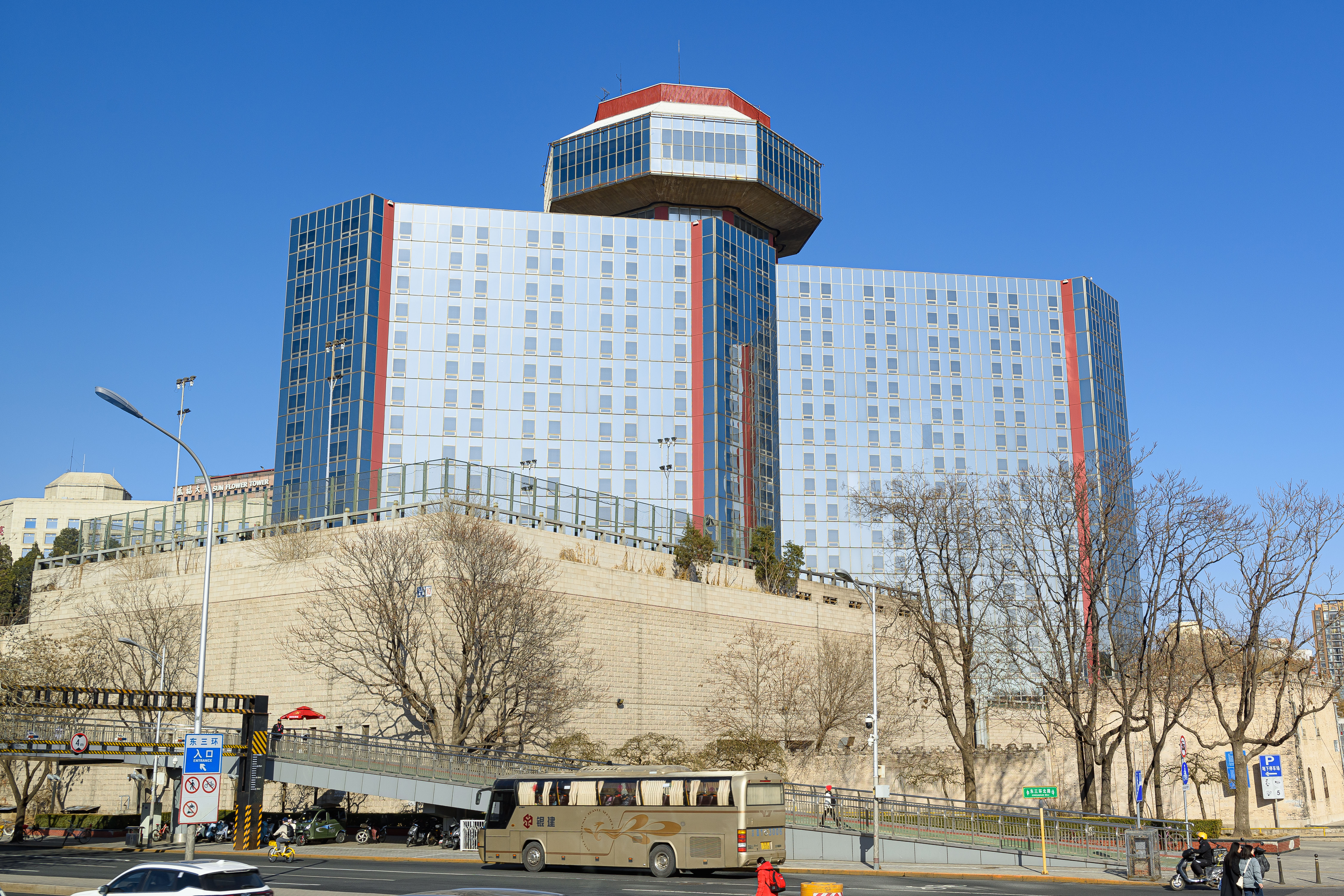
The Great Wall Hotel Beijing

Sheraton Riviera Resort in Dubrovnik

=== Early years ===
The origins of Sheraton Hotels date to 1933, when Harvard classmates Ernest Henderson and Robert Moore purchased the Continental Hotel in Cambridge, Massachusetts.

In 1937, Henderson and Moore purchased the Standard Investing Corporation and the International Equities Corporation, combining them into the Standard Equities Corporation, the company through which they would run their hotels. Also in 1937, they purchased their second hotel, and the first as part of the new company, the Stonehaven Hotel in Springfield, Massachusetts, a converted apartment building. Sheraton dates its founding to that year and considers that property its first hotel.

The chain got its name from the third hotel the pair acquired, in Boston, in 1939. It had a large lighted sign on the roof saying "Hotel Sheraton," which was too expensive to change. Instead, Henderson and Moore decided to call all of their hotels by that name. The original name was probably a reference to furniture designer Thomas Sheraton.

Henderson and Moore purchased Boston's famed Copley Plaza Hotel in 1941, and continued expanding rapidly, buying existing properties along the East Coast from Maine to Florida.

In 1946, the Standard Equities Corporation merged with the United States Realty and Improvement Corporation, forming the Sheraton Corporation of America, which became the first hotel chain to be listed on the New York Stock Exchange in 1947.

=== Expansion ===
In 1949, Sheraton expanded internationally, buying the Ford Hotels chain, with three properties in Toronto, Ottawa and Montreal. They quickly resold the Toronto and Ottawa properties to finance their continued Canadian expansion in 1950, paying $4.8 million to purchase Cardy Hotels, a chain of six properties in Ontario and Quebec. In April 1951, the Park Sheraton Hotel in New York City would host the 1951 NBA draft, which was the second ever draft under the NBA name and fifth overall NBA draft in existence by that time.

In 1956, Sheraton paid $30 million to buy the Eppley Hotel Company, which was then the largest privately held hotel business in the United States, with 22 properties across six Midwestern states. Sheraton retained ten of the largest hotels and immediately resold the other twelve. That same year, Sheraton acquired its first motels, purchasing two properties in the suburbs of Syracuse, New York. In 1957, Sheraton, which had previously focused on acquiring existing hotels, opened its first newly built hotel, the Philadelphia Sheraton Hotel. In 1958, Sheraton became the first hotel chain to centralize and computerize its reservations when it introduced Reservatron, the hotel industry's first automatic electronic reservations system.

In 1959, Sheraton acquired its first properties outside North America, purchasing four hotels owned by the Matson Lines on Waikiki Beach in Honolulu, Hawaii - the Moana Hotel, the Royal Hawaiian Hotel, the SurfRider Hotel, and the Princess Kaiulani Hotel. That same year Sheraton opened its first newly built motel, marketed as a "Highway Hotel," the Sheraton Inn, located in Binghamton, New York.

The early 1960s saw the arrival of the first Sheraton hotels outside the US and Canada, with the opening of the Sheraton-Tel Aviv Hotel in Israel in March 1961 and two Caribbean properties in 1962 - the Sheraton-Kingston Hotel in Jamaica and the Sheraton British Colonial in Nassau, Bahamas.

In 1962, Sheraton created a franchise division, primarily to operate Sheraton Motor Inns, large highway motels providing free parking. In 1963 Sheraton opened its first hotel in South America, the Macuto-Sheraton Hotel, outside Caracas, Venezuela. In 1965 the 100th Sheraton property, the Sheraton-Boston Hotel, opened. In 1966 Sheraton opened its first hotel in an Arab country, the Kuwait-Sheraton Hotel. In 1967 Sheraton unveiled Reservatron II, a computer system for personalized reservations. That same year, Sheraton opened its first hotel in Asia, the Sheraton-Philippines Hotel in Manila; its first hotel in Europe, the Sheraton-Du Cap Hotel on the island of Corsica in France; and its first hotels in Australia, two Sheraton Motor Hotels in Melbourne and Sydney.

=== Purchase by ITT ===
In 1968, the multinational conglomerate ITT Corporation purchased the chain and immediately sold eighteen aging Sheraton properties. Under ITT's ownership, Sheraton quickly moved away from ownership and operation of its properties to a new model of franchising and management, as the chain expanded greatly both in the US and abroad.

In late 1969, Sheraton introduced the hotel industry's first nationwide toll-free number, which displaced two hundred local Sheraton reservation numbers. The radio jingle for "Eight-Oh-Oh, Three-Two-Five, Three-Five Three-Five" "ran throughout the decade and into the eighties" but the jingle's lifespan went even beyond.

In 1970, Sheraton introduced the Sheraton Towers concept, a line of luxury "hotel-within-a-hotel" facilities designed for business travelers and located within Sheraton's largest and most exclusive hotels. The first Sheraton Towers to open was in the chain's flagship Sheraton-Boston Hotel. That same year, Sheraton opened its first hotel in North Africa, the Cario-Sheraton Hotel & Casino. In 1971 Sheraton opened its first hotels in Continental Europe, the Sheraton Stockholm Hotel and the Sheraton-Copenhagen Hotel. In 1972, Sheraton opened its first hotel in Sub-Saharan Africa, the Sheraton-Mont Febe Palace in Yaounde, Cameroon. From 1977 to 1997 the company was headquartered at 60 State Street in Boston.

In 1985, Sheraton became the first western chain to operate a hotel bearing the name of an international company in the People's Republic of China, when it assumed management of the Great Wall Hotel in Beijing, a financially troubled two-year-old Chinese-American joint venture, which became the Great Wall Sheraton.

By 1987, The New York Times described it as "50 years old, the world's largest hotel chain, and consumer-driven."

On October 24, 1989, Sheraton was officially rebranded as ITT Sheraton.

=== Development in the 1990s ===
On January 13, 1992, ITT Sheraton designated 28 of its premier hotels and 33 of the Sheraton Towers as the ITT Sheraton Luxury Collection. The flagship of the division was The St Regis in New York City.

In 1994, ITT Sheraton purchased a controlling interest in the Italian CIGA chain, the Compagnia Italiana Grandi Alberghi, or Italian Grand Hotels Company. The chain had begun by operating hotels in Italy, but over-expanded across Europe just as a recession hit, and had been seized from its previous owner, the Aga Khan, by its creditors. The majority of these hotels were placed in the ITT Sheraton Luxury Collection, though a few were placed in the Sheraton division.

In April 1995, ITT Sheraton introduced a new, mid-range hotel brand, Four Points by Sheraton, to replace the designation of certain hotels as Sheraton Inns.

=== Purchase by Starwood ===
In 1998, Starwood acquired ITT Sheraton for $13.3 billion, topping an offer by rival Hilton. Under Starwood's leadership, Sheraton began renovating many hotels and expanding the brand's footprint. Starwood also began marketing The Luxury Collection as a completely separate brand, even though it contained a large number of hotels still named Sheraton. Most of those properties have since been renamed. Only three such hotels remain today - Sheraton Addis in (Addis Ababa, Ethiopia), Sheraton Grande Sukhumvit in (Bangkok, Thailand), and Sheraton Kuwait in (Kuwait City, Kuwait). Also in 1998, Sheraton joined with the Arabella Hospitality Group in Germany to create ArabellaSheraton, a joint venture under which 14 Arabella Hotels in Germany, Switzerland and Spain were rebranded as ArabellaSheraton Hotels.

In 1999, Sheraton bought the outstanding shares in CIGA, giving it complete ownership.

In 2015, Starwood introduced the "Sheraton Grand" brand, higher-end Sheraton properties located in urban or resort destinations.

=== Takeover by Marriott ===
In 2016, Marriott International purchased Starwood Hotels, and the newly merged company again became the world's largest hotel and resort company. Although the Sheraton brand expresses quality in Asia, aging properties have made the US market more problematic.

In 2023, Marriott announced a new spinoff brand of Four Points by Sheraton, called Four Points Express by Sheraton, targeting the mid-range market in Europe, the Middle East and Africa. Its first property opened in Nilüfer, Bursa, Turkey that fall. In 2024, the brand was renamed Four Points Flex by Sheraton.

== Accommodations ==
		North America	Europe	Middle E. & Africa	Asia & Pacific	Caribbean Latin Am.	Total
2016	Properties	196	62	30	123	38	449
2016	Rooms	74,350	17,069	10,015	47,207	10,183	158,824
2017	Properties	192	62	30	122	35	441
2017	Rooms	73,074	16,847	10,236	46,143	9,450	155,750
2018	Properties	190	61	31	123	36	441
2018	Rooms	72,674	16,580	10,408	46,073	9,882	155,617
2019	Properties	189	62	31	130	35	447
2019	Rooms	72,039	17,054	9,910	47,878	9,682	156,563
2020	Properties	183	62	30	136	31	442
2020	Rooms	70,245	16,900	9,299	49,399	8,613	154,456
2021	Properties	178	57	33	139	30	437
2021	Rooms	68,824	16,008	9,699	50,315	8,396	153,242
2022	Properties	172	50	33	146	29	430
2022	Rooms	66,621	14,096	9,516	52,487	8,226	150,946
2023	Properties	168	51	32	155	30	436
2023	Rooms	64,923	14,279	9,234	55,316	8,442	152,194
2024	Properties	166	49	32	155	29	431
2024	Rooms	64,254	13,469	9,513	55,313	8,091	150,640

== See also ==
- Eppley Hotel Company
- List of chained-brand hotels
- List of lists of hotels
- Hawaii Bowl
