= 2023 Special Honours =

British government recognitions

As part of the British honours system, Special Honours are issued at the Monarch's pleasure at any given time. The Special Honours refer to the awards made within royal prerogative, operational honours, political honours and other honours awarded outside the New Year Honours and Birthday Honours.

== Royal peerages ==
- His Royal Highness The Duke of Cornwall, Rothesay and Cambridge, KG, KT, PC, ADC the additional titles Prince of Wales and Earl of Chester – 13 February 2023
- His Royal Highness The Earl of Wessex and Forfar, KG, GCVO, ADC the additional title Duke of Edinburgh for life – 9 March 2023

== Life peerage ==
- The Right Honourable Sir Edward Young, GCB, GCVO, to be Baron Young of Old Windsor, of Old Windsor in the Royal County of Berkshire – 13 June 2023
- Darren Mott, OBE, to be Baron Mott, of Chatteris in the County of Cambridgeshire – 19 June 2023
- Dr. Kay Swinburne, to be Baroness Swinburne, of Llandysul in the County of Ceredigion – 20 June 2023
- The Right Honourable Dame Sue Carr, DBE, to be Baroness Carr of Walton-on-the-Hill, of Walton-on-the-Hill in the County of Surrey – 6 November 2023
- The Right Honourable David Cameron, to be Baron Cameron of Chipping Norton, of Chipping Norton in the County of Oxfordshire – 17 November 2023
- Robbie Douglas-Miller, OBE, to be Baron Douglas-Miller, of The Hopes in the County of East Lothian – 15 December 2023

== Lord Lieutenant ==
- Ian Crowe, MBE – to be Lord-Lieutenant of the County Borough of Londonderry – 12 January 2023
- Andrew Try – to be Lord-Lieutenant of the Royal County of Berkshire – 1 August 2023
- Amanda Parker – to be Lord-Lieutenant for the County of Lancashire – 3 August 2023
- Alexander Scott – to be Lord-Lieutenant of the County of Cumbria – 6 July 2023
- Professor Veronica Pickering – to be Lord-Lieutenant of Nottinghamshire – 6 December 2023

== Privy Counsellor ==
- Maria Eagle MP – 15 February 2023
- Marcus Jones MP – 8 March 2023
- Craig Whittaker MP – 8 March 2023
- Kelly Tolhurst MP – 8 March 2023
- Alex Chalk KC, MP – 26 April 2023
- Humza Yousaf MSP – 17 May 2023
- Claire Coutinho MP – 15 September 2023
- Steve Baker MP – 15 November 2023
- Craig Williams MP – 15 November 2023
- Sir Graham Brady MP – 15 November 2023
- Victoria Atkins MP – 15 November 2023
- Richard Holden MP – 13 December 2023
- Laura Trott MBE, MP – 13 December 2023

== Lord-in-waiting ==
Permanent Lord-in-waiting

- The Most Honourable The Marquess of Cholmondeley, GCVO, DL – 17 March 2023
- The Right Honourable Sir Edward Young, GCB, GCVO – 15 May 2023

== Equerry ==
Extra Equerry to the King

- Vice Admiral Sir Anthony Blackburn, KCVO, CB – 17 March 2023 – Position as extra equerry renewed, originally appointed in 2000.
- Lieutenant Colonel Sir Andrew Ford, GCVO – 17 March 2023 – Position as extra equerry renewed, originally appointed in 2005.
- Commodore Anthony Morrow, CVO – 17 March 2023
- Admiral Sir George Zambellas, GCB, DSC, DL – 17 March 2023
- Lieutenant General Sir Alistair Irwin, KCB, CBE – 17 March 2023
- His Excellency Lieutenant General Sir John Lorimer, KCB, DSO, MBE – 17 March 2023.
- Vice Admiral Sir Tony Johnstone-Burt, KCVO, CB, OBE – 17 March 2023 – Position as extra equerry renewed, year originally appointed unknown.
- Lieutenant Colonel Sir Alexander Matheson, 8th Baronet, LVO, DL – 17 March 2023 – Position as extra equerry renewed, originally appointed in 2006.
- Lieutenant Colonel Michael Vernon – 17 March 2023 – Position as extra equerry renewed, originally appointed in 2015.
- Lieutenant Colonel Stephen Segrave – 17 March 2023 – Position as extra equerry renewed, originally appointed in 2019.
- Sir Nicholas Bacon, 14th Baronet, KCVO, OBE, DL – 17 March 2023
- Commander Richard Aylard, CVO – 17 March 2023
- Major General Arthur Denaro, CBE, DL – 17 March 2023
- Sir Stephen Lamport, GCVO, DL – 17 March 2023
- Ashe Windham, CVO – 17 March 2023

== Most Noble Order of the Garter ==
Ribbon bar of the Order of the Garter

=== Knight/Lady Companion (KG/LG) ===
- The Right Honourable The Baroness Ashton of Upholland, GCMG – 23 April 2023
- The Right Honourable The Lord Patten of Barnes, CH – 23 April 2023

== Most Ancient and Most Noble Order of the Thistle ==
Order of the Thistle ribbon

=== Extra Lady of the Order of the Thistle (LT) ===
- Her Majesty The Queen, LG ONZ GCVO CSM CD PC – 16 June 2023

== Most Honourable Order of the Bath ==
Ribbon bar of the Order of the Bath

=== Knight Grand Cross of the Order of the Bath (GCB) ===
- The Right Honourable Sir Edward Young, KCVO – 15 May 2023

Honorary

- His Excellency Frank-Walter Steinmeier – President of Germany – 29 March 2023
- His Excellency Yoon Suk Yeol – President of South Korea – 21 November 2023

=== Knight Commander of the Order of the Bath (KCB) ===
- The Right Honourable David Davis MP. Member of Parliament for Haltemprice and Howden, formerly Secretary of State for Exiting the European Union. For public and political service – 29 December 2023.

=== Companion of the Order of the Bath (CB) ===
- Major General Michael Richard Elviss, MBE – 14 April 2023

== Most Distinguished Order of St Michael and St George ==
Ribbon bar of the Order of St Michael and St George

=== Knight / Dame Grand Cross of the Order of St Michael and St George (GCMG) ===
- Her Excellency Marcella Liburd, JP – On her appointment as Governor-General of Saint Kitts and Nevis – 26 January 2023
- Her Excellency The Most Honourable Cynthia Alexandria Pratt, ON CB CD JP – Governor-General of the Bahamas – 11 December 2023

== Royal Victorian Order ==
Royal Victorian Order ribbon

=== Knight Grand Cross of the Royal Victorian Order (GCVO) ===
- The Right Honourable Sir Edward Young, KCVO – on relinquishing his appointment as Joint Principal Private Secretary to His Majesty The King, and former Private Secretary to Her Majesty Queen Elizabeth II – 15 May 2023
- The Right Reverend David John Conner, KCVO – on relinquishing his appointment of Dean of The King's Free Chapel of St George at Windsor Castle, Domestic Chaplain, and Register of the Order of the Garter – 19 July 2023

=== Knight Commander of the Royal Victorian Order (KCVO) ===
- The Very Reverend Dr. David Ison – on relinquishing his appointment as Dean of St Paul's, and Dean Order of the British Empire and Order of St Michael and St George – 30 May 2023
- Major General Christopher Ghika, CBE – on relinquishing his appointment of General Officer Commanding London District, and Major General Commanding the Household Division – 28 June 2023
- The Right Reverend James William Scobie Newcome – on relinquishing his appointment as Clerk of the Closet – 15 November 2023
- Lieutenant Colonel Anthony Charles Richards, CVO – lately Deputy Master of the Household and Equerry to Her Majesty Queen Elizabeth II – 28 November 2023

=== Commander of the Royal Victorian Order (CVO) ===
- Her Excellency Jill Gallard, CMG – British Ambassador to Germany – 29 March 2023
- Surgeon Captain David Hett – upon relinquishing his appointment as Medical Officer to Queen Elizabeth II Abroad, and Tour Doctor to The King – 30 May 2023
- Her Excellency Dame Menna Rawlings, DCMG – British Ambassador to France – 22 September 2023
- His Excellency Neil Wigan, OBE – British High Commissioner to Kenya – 3 November 2023
- Mark James Lane, LVO – lately Gardens Manager, London Palaces, Royal Household – 8 November 2023
- Dr. Grahame Clive Davies, LVO – lately Private Secretary to The Prince of Wales – 6 December 2023
- Hannah Howard – upon relinquishing her appointment as Communications Secretary, Royal Household – 19 December 2023

=== Lieutenant of the Royal Victorian Order (LVO) ===
- Peter Gates, MVO – on his relinquishment of the appointment of Finance Manager, Royal Collection Trust – 8 May 2023
- Colonel Tom Christopher Stephen Bonas – on relinquishment of the role of Regimental Adjutant, Welsh Guards – 28 June 2023
- Alexander Theophilus Rycroft, CMG – Minister and Deputy Head of Mission at the Embassy of the United Kingdom, Paris – 22 September 2023
- Josephine Gauld – Deputy British High Commissioner to Kenya and Permanent Representative to the UNEP and UN Habitat – 3 November 2023
- Dr Anton Borg – for service as Apothecary to The King – 15 December 2023

=== Member of the Royal Victorian Order (MVO) ===
- Ciara Courtney – 29 March 2023
- Harriet Kyle – 29 March 2023
- Gillian Marks – 29 March 2023
- Nicholas Teller – Honorary Consul, British Consulate Hamburg – 29 March 2023
- Nicholas Wareham – Head of Communications & Bilateral Team, British Embassy Berlin – 29 March 2023
- Simon James Hickling – on relinquishment of the role of Deputy Land Agent at Sandringham – 11 July 2023
- Captain Jiwan Prasad Gurung, The Royal Gurkha Rifles – on relinquishment of the role of The King's Gurkha Orderly Officer – 11 July 2023
- Captain Narendradhoj Gurung, Queen's Gurkha Engineers – on relinquishment of the role of The King's Gurkha Orderly Officer – 11 July 2023
- Emily Casey – 22 September 2023
- Emily Holdup – First Secretary (Foreign Policy), British Embassy Paris – 22 September 2023
- Dominique Olley – Consul, British Consulate Bordeaux – 22 September 2023
- Benjamin Edward Newick, MBE RVM – Butler to HM Ambassador, Paris – 22 September 2023
- Emily Partington – Head of Protocol & VIP Visits, British Embassy Paris – 22 September 2023
- Jennifer Jordan-Saifi – lately Assistant Private Secretary to The King (Commonwealth and Sustainability) – 10 November 2023
- James Charles Robison Fishwick, Chief Inspector, Metropolitan Police Service – For services to Royalty Protection – 22 November 2023
- Gareth Evans – lately Fire Safety Manager, Royal Household – 5 December 2023

== Most Excellent Order of the British Empire ==
Ribbon bar of the Order of the British Empire (Civil)

Ribbon bar of the Order of the British Empire (Military)

=== Knight / Dame Commander of the Order of the British Empire (KBE / DBE) ===
Civil division

- Angela Ahrendts, DBE – 18 January 2023 – Honorary appointed in 2013 to be made Substantive
- Professor Adrian Hill, KBE – 18 January 2023 – Honorary appointed in 2021 to be made Substantive
- The Right Honourable Michael Ellis, KC MP – Member of Parliament for Northampton North, formerly Attorney General. For public and political service – 16 June 2023
- The Honourable Mrs. Justice Julia Amanda Dias, KC – 11 July 2023
- The Honourable Mrs. Justice Eleanor Mary Henrietta Hill, KC – 11 July 2023
- The Honourable Mrs. Justice Sarah Mary Morgan, KC – 11 July 2023
- The Right Honourable Karen Bradley MP. – Member of Parliament for Staffordshire Moorlands, formerly was Secretary of State for Northern Ireland and Secretary of State for Digital, Culture, Media and Sport. For public and political service – 29 December 2023.

Honorary

- Dr Jeffrey Cheah – Founder and Chairman of Sunway Group. For services to higher education, the National Health Service and philanthropy

=== Commander of the Order of the British Empire (CBE) ===
Civil division

- Bryn St. Pierre Parry – For services to members of the Armed Forces, Veterans and their Families – 8 February 2023

Military division

- Brigadier Christopher King, British Army – in recognition of gallant and distinguished service in the field – 27 October 2023

Honorary

- Professor Peter Halligan – Former Chief Scientific Adviser for Wales. For services to neuropsychology research and to science in Government.
- Anil Kashyap – Lately External Member, Financial Policy Committee, Bank of England. For services to the economy
- Professor Shabir Madhi – Dean, Faculty of Health Sciences, University of the Witwatersrand. For services to science and public health in a global pandemic

=== Officer of the Order of the British Empire (OBE) ===
Military division

- Lieutenant Colonel Oliver James Stead, Army Air Corps – in recognition of gallant and distinguished service in the field – 14 April 2023
- Lieutenant Colonel Simon Paul Worth, Royal Tank Regiment – in recognition of gallant and distinguished service in the field – 14 April 2023
- Lieutenant Colonel Edward Charles Malet Hall, MBE, Royal Marines – in recognition of gallant and distinguished service in the field – 27 October 2023
- Captain John Matthew Punch, MBE, Royal Navy – in recognition of gallant and distinguished service in the field – 27 October 2023
- Lieutenant Colonel Martin Gerard Windsor, The Royal Logistic Corps – in recognition of gallant and distinguished service in the field – 27 October 2023
- Group Captain Andrew Chisholm, Royal Air Force – in recognition of gallant and distinguished service in the field – 27 October 2023

Honorary

- Professor Salvatore Bordonali – Professor Emeritus of Ecclesiastical Law. For services to the Church of England in Italy
- Alina Cojocaru – Ballet Dancer. For services to Ballet
- Piotr Cywiński – Director of the Auschwitz-Birkenau State Museum, President of the Auschwitz-Birkenau Foundation. For services to Holocaust education and inter-faith dialogue
- Dimitris Daskalopoulos – Art collector and Entrepreneur. For services to the arts and philanthropy
- Colonel Joachim Nils Göran Isacsson – Assistant Head 2, Futures and Strategic Analysis Programme, Development, Concepts and Doctrine Centre. For services to the UK/Sweden defence relationship
- John Kani – Actor, writer and director. For services to drama
- Ronald Kind – Congressman, US House of Representatives. For services to UK/US relations
- Patrick Leahy – former US Senator. For services to UK/US relations
- Ravindra Limaye – Managing Director, Wockhardt UK. For services to health, particularly during COVID-19
- Hugo MacNeill – Lately Chair of the British-Irish Association. For services to British-Irish relations
- Dr. Margaret McGuire – Nursing and Midwifery Council member (Scotland); former Executive Nurse Director, National Health Service, Greater Glasgow and Clyde, Scotland. For services to the National Health Service
- Sandra Morgan – Honorary Consul, Ohio. For services to UK/US relationship
- Dr Vahé Nafilyan – Health Statistician at the Office for National Statistics. For services to statistics and public health during COVID-19
- David Brenton Simons – President and Chief Executive Officer, New England Historic Genealogical Society. For services to Anglo-American history
- June O'Sullivan – Chief Executive Officer, London Early Years Foundation. For services to Education
- Gonzalo Ulloa Y Suelves – Lately Honorary Legal Adviser, British Embassy Madrid. For services to British interests in Spain

=== Member of the Order of the British Empire (MBE) ===
Military division

- Lance Corporal Elizabeth Duggleby-Cantrell, Intelligence Corps – in recognition of gallant and distinguished service in the field – 14 April 2023
- Captain Darren Johnson, The Royal Dragoon Guards – in recognition of gallant and distinguished service in the field – 14 April 2023
- Staff Sergeant Jodi Marie Johnson, Intelligence Corps – in recognition of gallant and distinguished service in the field – 14 April 2023
- Major Mark Richard Hort Player, The Royal Logistic Corps – in recognition of gallant and distinguished service in the field – 14 April 2023
- Major Lauren Frances Shepherd, The Royal Logistic Corps – in recognition of gallant and distinguished service in the field – 14 April 2023
- Acting Warrant Officer James William Putland, Royal Air Force – in recognition of gallant and distinguished service in the field – 14 April 2023
- Lieutenant Colonel Paul James Martin, Royal Irish Regiment – in recognition of gallant and distinguished service in the field – 27 October 2023
- Major Sam Anthony John Tooth, The Royal Electrical and Mechanical Engineers – in recognition of gallant and distinguished service in the field – 27 October 2023
- Captain Laurence David Jones, General Service Corps, Army Reserve – in recognition of gallant and distinguished service in the field – 27 October 2023

Honorary

- Anthony Barclay – Volunteer, RNIB. For services to visually impaired people in Northern Ireland
- Rachael Blackmore – Jockey. For services to sport
- Mridula Chakaborty – Principal Engineer, TUV NEL Ltd. For charitable services to the Asian community in Scotland
- Elżbieta Dabrowska – Lately Vice-Consul, British Embassy Warsaw. For services to British nationals
- Ayşen Guven – Director for Education, British Council, Turkey. For services to cultural relations between the UK and Turkey
- Dr. William Hardy – Senior Medical Officer, Ascension Island Government. For services to the Health and Well-being of the Ascension Island Community
- Dr. Aoife Hunt – Market Leader, Movement Strategies (a GHD company). For services to the COVID-19 response
- Ahmad Shoaib Jawad – lately British Council Project Manager, English for Security and Defence, Afghanistan. For services to English language training
- Stefan Kitanov – Founder and Director, Sofia International Film Festival. For services to UK film in Bulgaria
- Kazumasa Kuwahara – Senior Advisor to International Nuclear Services, Japan (INSJ). For services to the UK nuclear industry in Japan
- Ross McMahon – Chief Executive Officer, Kendal Nutricare (Kendamil). For services to international trade and the community in Kendal, Cumbria
- Dr. Sarah Meisch Lionetto – lately Director of Arts and Creative Industries, British Council, Singapore. For services to British arts and inclusivity in Singapore
- Mattur Nandakumara – Executive Director, The Bhavan. For services to the teaching, performance and accessibility of Indian classical arts in the UK
- Lynne Rickabaugh – Chair, Royal Oak Foundation. For services to the National Trust
- Gorazd Vecko – Performance Director, Paralympics GB Table Tennis. For services to Paralympics Table Tennis
- Kim Ji-soo – Advocate for the COP26 Summit
- Jennie Kim – Advocate for the COP26 Summit
- Roseann Park – Advocate for the COP26 Summit
- Lalisa Manoban – Advocate for the COP26 Summit

== Knight Bachelor ==
Knight Bachelor ribbon

- The Right Honourable Brandon Lewis CBE MP. Member of Parliament for Great Yarmouth, formerly Lord Chancellor and Secretary of State for Justice. For public and political service – 16 June 2023.
- The Honourable Mr. Justice Joel Nathan Bennathan, KC – 11 July 2023
- The Honourable Mr. Justice Robert Graham Bright, KC – 11 July 2023
- The Honourable Mr. Justice Adam Michael Constable, KC – 11 July 2023
- The Honourable Mr. Justice Stephen Alexander Fowler, KC – 11 July 2023
- The Honourable Mr. Justice Patrick Joseph Kinney, KC – 11 July 2023
- The Honourable Mr. Justice Eason Thurai Rajah, KC – 11 July 2023
- The Honourable Mr. Justice Jonathan Michael Richards, KC – 11 July 2023
- The Honourable Mr. Justice Richard James Smith, KC – 11 July 2023
- The Honourable Mr. Justice Derek Antony Sweeting, KC – 11 July 2023
- The Right Honourable Dr Liam Fox MP. Member of Parliament for North Somerset, formerly Secretary of State for International Trade and Secretary of State for Defence. For public and political service – 29 December 2023.
- The Right Honourable Jeremy Quin MP. Member of Parliament for Horsham, formerly Paymaster General and Minister for the Cabinet Office, Minister for Crime, Policing and Fire for the Home Office. For public and political service – 29 December 2023.

== British Empire Medal (BEM) ==
Ribbon bar of the British Empire Medal (Civil)

Honorary

- Smita Arattukulam – lately Vice Consul, British Embassy Oman. For services to British nationals in Oman
- Andries Du Plessis – Social Worker Older Adults, NHS Highland. For services to older people in Ullapool
- Margaret Gregg – Secretary, South Tyneside Asylum Seekers and Refugees Church Help. For services to asylum seekers and refugees
- Professor Olexiy Haran – Head of Democratic Initiatives Foundation. For services to UK/Ukrainian relations
- Militsa Pribetich-Gill – lately Head of Employee Wellbeing, Yeovil District Hospital and lately Health and Wellbeing Lead, Nightingale Hospital Bristol. For services to National Health Service staff during COVID-19
- Tomas Reichental – Holocaust survivor and educator. For services to holocaust education, awareness and commemoration
- Nataliia Rybak – Vice-Consul, British Embassy Kyiv. For services to UK consular interests in Ukraine
- Clare Slight – Founding Member, Broke Not Broken. For services to tackling the effects of poverty
- Valentin Valyoski – Residence Gardener, British Embassy Sofia. For services to strengthening UK/Bulgaria relations
- Dr. Svitlana Yavorska – Policy Officer, British Embassy Kyiv. For services to UK interests in Ukraine

== Royal Red Cross ==
Royal Red Cross ribbon

=== Associate Royal Red Cross (ARRC) ===
- Captain Richard Harry Ainsworth-Masiello, Queen Alexandra's Royal Army Nursing Corps – in recognition of gallant and distinguished service in the field – 27 October 2023

== Queen's Gallantry Medal (QGM) ==
Ribbon bar of the King's Gallantry Medal

These are the last recipients to be awarded the Queen's Gallantry Medal; all future recipients will receive the King's Gallantry Medal (KGM).

For intervening in an armed attack on 5th May 2020.

- Lisa Way
- Ayette Bounouri
- John Rees (posthumous)

For their actions during the terrorist attack at the Learning Together event in Fishmongers' Hall, London on 29th November 2019.

- Steven Gallant
- John Crilly
- Darryn Frost
- Lukasz Koczocik

== Imperial Service Medal (ISM) ==
Ribbon bar of the Imperial Service Medal

- Michael James Andrews, Field Interviewer, Office for National Statistics – 4 January 2023
- Ms. Victoria Louise Rushton, Ministry of Defence – 24 January 2023
- Mrs. Victoria Jayne Howard, Ministry of Defence – 24 January 2023
- Mrs. Wendy Margaret Cracroft, Ministry of Defence – 7 February 2023
- Appointments 14 March 2023
- Mrs. Bridget Anne Kerr, Administrative Officer, Northern Ireland Department for Infrastructure – 21 March 2023
- Jeffrey William James Gow Simpson, Ministry of Defence – 28 March 2023
- Appointments 9 May 2023
- Appointments 14 August 2023
- Paul Stephen Fisher, Ministry of Defence – 19 September 2023
- Appointments 21 November 2023

== King's / Queen's Commendation for Bravery ==
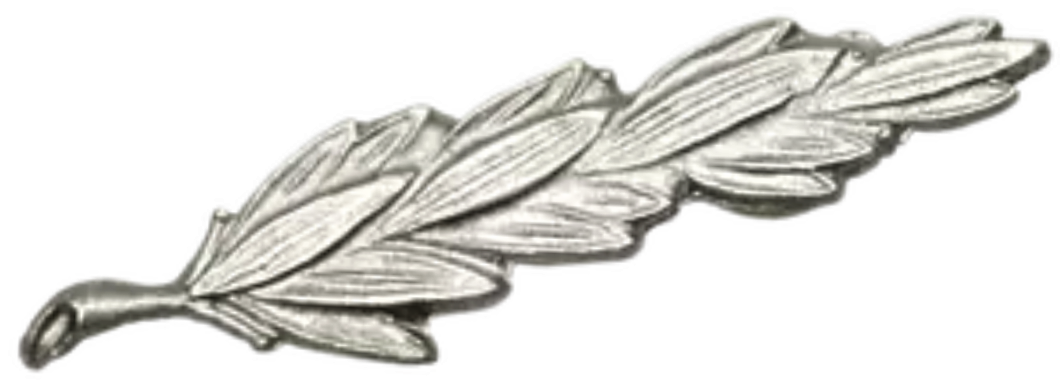
King's Commendation for Bravery

=== Queen's Commendation for Bravery ===
These are the last recipients to be awarded the Queen's Commendation for Bravery; all subsequent recipients receive the King's Commendation for Bravery.

For his actions during the terrorist attack at the Learning Together event in Fishmongers' Hall, London on 29th November 2019.

- Adam Roberts

For rescuing the occupants of a vehicle that crashed and caught fire on the A38 on 21st June 2021.

- Ed Durante
- Craig Jones

For rescuing her neighbour from a house fire on 28th January 2020.

- Bardha Kola

For rescuing a distressed man from the River Irwell on 17th February 2018.

- PC Mohammed Nadeem

For rescuing a woman from a fatal house fire on 1st January 2019.

- Kenneth Wood
- Rafal Majchrzak

For rescuing a motorist from their vehicle following a head on collision on 11th May 2019.

- Andrew Lax

=== King's Commendation for Bravery ===
For attempting to save the life of a fellow soldier, who was critically injured by a herd of charging elephants, in Malawi on 5th May 2019.

- Lance Sergeant Robert John Padgham, Coldstream Guards – 14 April 2023

For assisting in saving the lives of five sailors aboard a stricken yacht which was taking on water in very difficult conditions in the Central English Channel on 10th November 2022.

- Chief Petty Officer Engineering Technician (Marine Engineering) Stephen Froom, Royal Navy – 27 October 2023

For demonstrating extraordinary boat handling in order to assist in saving the lives of five sailors aboard a stricken yacht which was taking on water in very difficult conditions in the Central English Channel on 10th November 2022.

- Able Seaman First Class Alfie Hulme, Royal Navy – 27 October 2023

== King's Commendation for Valuable Service ==
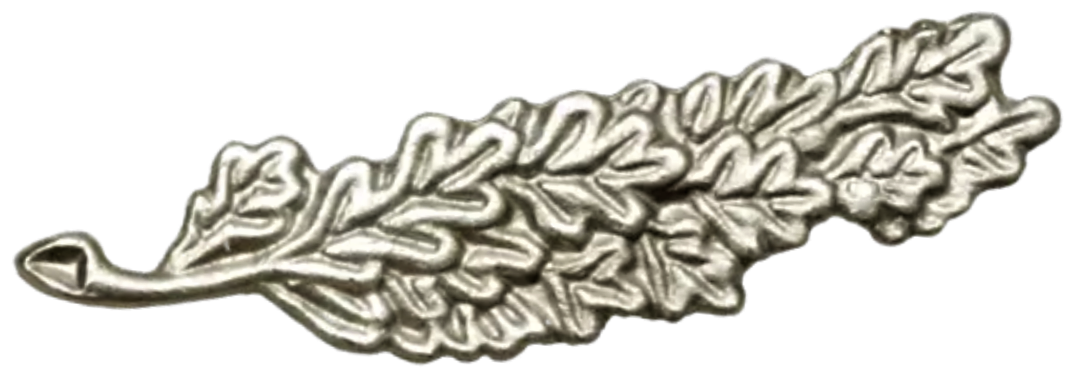
King's Commendation for Valuable Service

- Staff Sergeant Kenneth Robert Copeland, Army Air Corps – 14 April 2023
- Major Stephanie Ann Manning-Degobertiere, Royal Regiment of Artillery – 14 April 2023
- Captain Lucy Monica Manners Powell, The Royal Logistic Corps – 14 April 2023
- Major Benjamin Andrew White, Corps of Royal Engineers – 14 April 2023
- Private Harry James Dear, The Royal Logistic Corps – 14 April 2023
- Leading Photographer Belinda-Jane Alker, Royal Navy – 27 October 2023
- Lieutenant Commander Oliver Richard Beedom Ayers, Royal Navy – 27 October 2023
- Warrant Officer Class 2 Jamie David Forbes, The Royal Regiment of Artillery – 27 October 2023
- Captain Robert Malcolm Jenkins, Corps of Royal Engineers – 27 October 2023
- Sergeant Michael Joseph Ogden, The Grenadier Guards – 27 October 2023
- Corporal Navin Kumar Rai, The Queen's Own Gurkha Logistic Regiment – 27 October 2023
- Major Alanda Christine Scott, Corps of Royal Engineers – 27 October 2023
- Major Laurence Malcolm Crozier Wilson, The Royal Regiment of Artillery – 27 October 2023
- Major Paul William Young, Corps of Royal Electrical and Mechanical Engineers – 27 October 2023
- Wing Commander Henry Michael Austin Cummins, DL, Royal Auxiliary Air Force – 27 October 2023

== Order of St John ==
Order of St John ribbon

=== Dame Grand Cross of the Order of St John (GCStJ) ===
- Ann Elizabeth Cable, MBE DL – 7 February 2023

=== Dame of Justice of the Order of St John (DStJ) ===
- Her Royal Highness Princess Raiyah bint Al Hussein – 12 April 2023

=== Commander of the Order of St John (CStJ) ===
- John Andrew Armitt – 7 February 2023
- Dr. Cheryle June Berry, MBE – 7 February 2023
- Reverend Stephen Alastair Blakey – 7 February 2023
- Dr. Dale Cartwright, JP – 7 February 2023
- Lieutenant General Richard John Cripwell, CB CBE – 7 February 2023
- Michael Robert Crosbie – 7 February 2023
- David Miles Davies – 7 February 2023
- Meryl Catherine Dean – 7 February 2023
- The Reverend Neil Norman Gardner – 7 February 2023
- The Right Reverend Bishop Andrew William Lindsay Hedge – 7 February 2023
- Georgina Alice Holloway – 7 February 2023
- Sir John Wilfred Peace, CBE – 7 February 2023
- Professor Sir Keith MacDonald Porter – 7 February 2023
- Simon Aeneas Mackintosh – 7 February 2023
- Dorothy Noelene Marks – 7 February 2023
- William Ramsay McGhee – 7 February 2023
- Professor Paul Mealor – 7 February 2023
- Christopher George Reynolds – 7 February 2023
- Susan Jean Sheldon, JP – 7 February 2023
- Andrew Ian Smith – 7 February 2023
- Diane Margaret Smith – 7 February 2023
- Agnes Gray Taylor – 7 February 2023
- Peter Gerard Tranter – 7 February 2023
- Sheriff George Alexander Way of Plean – 7 February 2023
- The Reverend Louis Zampese – 7 February 2023
- Andrew John Blackman – 12 April 2023
- David Thomas Boven – 12 April 2023
- Charles Palmer Carroll – 12 April 2023
- Christine Ruth Clarke – 12 April 2023
- Caryn Laura Cox – 12 April 2023
- Douglas Daniel Garson – 12 April 2023
- Dr. Stephen Chung Ka-Leung – 12 April 2023
- Colonel Robert Cecil John Martin, OBE, DL – 12 April 2023
- Jane Elizabeth Mermelstein – 12 April 2023
- Dr. Benita Louis Atiyeh Miller – 12 April 2023
- Elizabeth Ann Paul – 12 April 2023
- John Michael Allen-Petrie – 12 April 2023
- Catherine Anne Pyke – 12 April 2023
- Jon Malcom Swenson – 12 April 2023
- Sian Elizabeth Thomas – 12 April 2023
- Commander (Retd) James Gearey Ward – 12 April 2023
- Albert Norman Williams – 12 April 2023
- Brian Arthur Wingate – 12 April 2023
- Dr. Andrew Yu – 12 April 2023

=== Officer of the Order of St John (OStJ) ===
- – appointments 7 February 2023
- – appointments 12 April 2023

=== Member of the Order of St John (MStJ) ===
- – appointments 7 February 2023
- – appointments 12 April 2023
