= Confessions of a Sociopath =

2013 autobiography by M.E. Thomas

Confessions of a Sociopath: A Life Spent Hiding in Plain Sight
- First edition
- Author: M.E. Thomas
- Language: English
- Genre: Autobiography; Psychology
- Publisher: Crown Publishers (US); Sidgwick and Jackson (UK)
- Publication date: 14 May 2013
- Publication place: United Kingdom; United States
- Media type: Print (Hardcover)
- Pages: 163
- ISBN: 978-0-307-95666-8

Confessions of a Sociopath: A Life Spent Hiding in Plain Sight is a 2013 book written by a female law professor under the pen name of M.E. Thomas, describing her up-and-down life as a sociopath. The book describes sociopathy as a disorder that consists of a spectrum of behaviors, rather than the more simplistic stereotype of serial killers. Thomas claims sociopathy helped her be a better lawyer, and in an interview, she suggests that revealing herself in the book helps keep her in check: "Because there's that much pressure and scrutiny, I think I actually will be more successful in continuing to be a good member of society." Lacking her own moral code, she relies on the teachings of her church, The Church of Jesus Christ of Latter-day Saints.

On her agent's advice, Thomas requested a psychological evaluation from John Edens, a psychology professor at Texas A&M University, before submitting her book for publication. After administering multiple tests, Edens concluded that Thomas is indeed a sociopath.

The author later appeared in disguise on Dr. Phil discussing the subject. Business Insider reported that Thomas' book made the idea of a "successful sociopath" mainstream. A review in The New York Times described the book as "intermittingly gripping" and "a revelatory if contradictory muddle of a memoir". Prospero, the books and arts column in The Economist, notes how the writing in the book clearly displays the characteristics of sociopathy: bombast, calculation, deceit, and charm.

Actress Viola Davis said she prepared for her role of Amanda Waller in Suicide Squad by reading Confessions of a Sociopath.

A one-hour dramedy, based on the book, is in development, starring and being co-written by Lisa Edelstein.

== See also ==
- The Mask of Sanity (1941) by Hervey Cleckley
- The Sociopath Next Door (2006) by Martha Stout
- Snakes in Suits (2006) by Paul Babiak and Robert D. Hare
- The Good Psychopath's Guide to Success (2014) by Dr. Kevin Dutton and Andy McNab
- Sociopath: A Memoir (2024) by Patric Gagne
