= Help for Heroes =

Organization

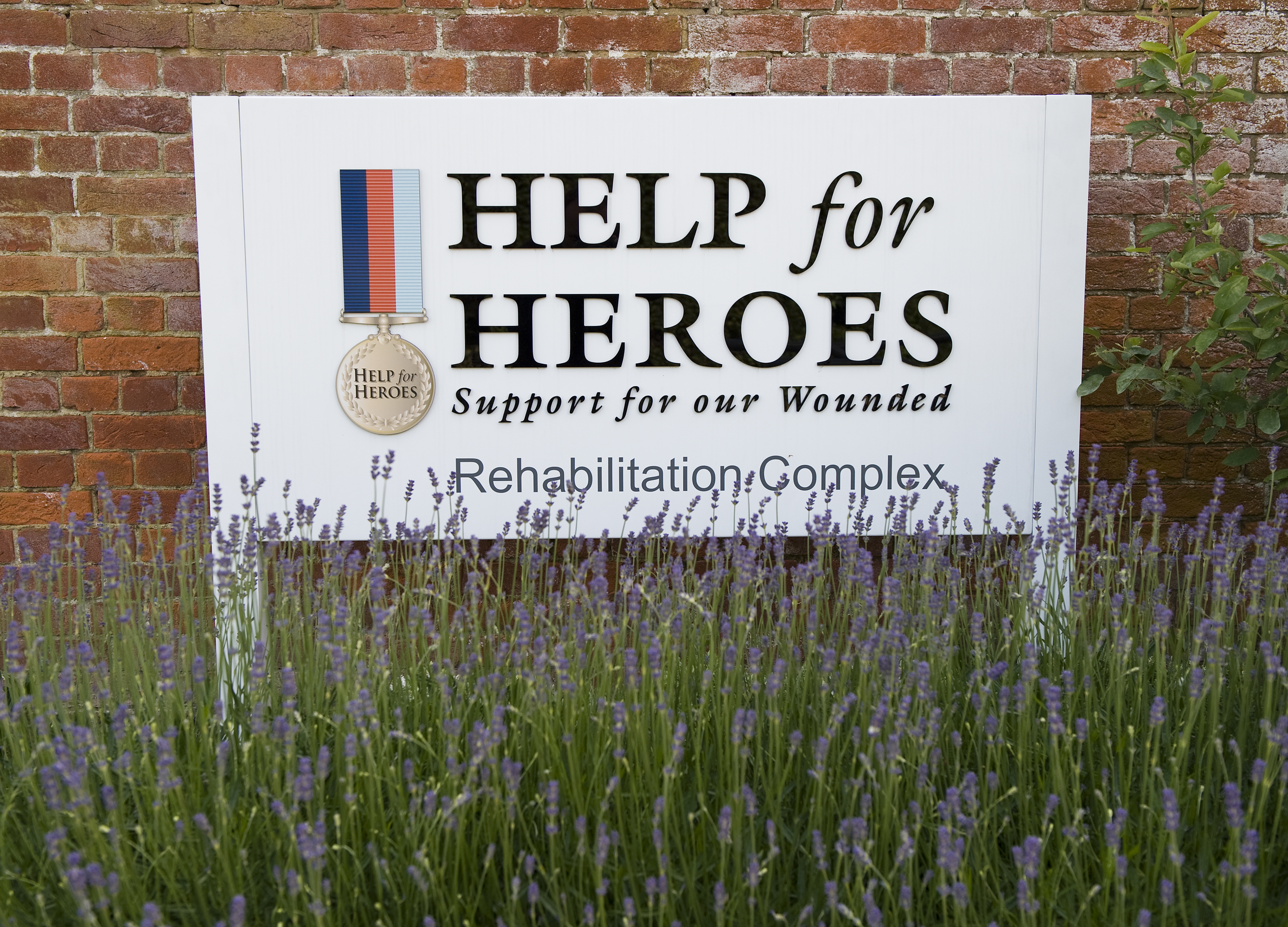
- Help for Heroes sign at the Defence Medical Rehabilitation Unit, Headley Court, Surrey
- Formation: 1 October 2007; 18 years ago
- Founders: Bryn Parry; Emma Parry
- Type: Charitable organisation
- Purpose: Supporting members of the Armed Forces Community
- Headquarters: Downton, Salisbury, Wiltshire
- Chief Executive Officer: James Needham
- Website: www.helpforheroes.org.uk

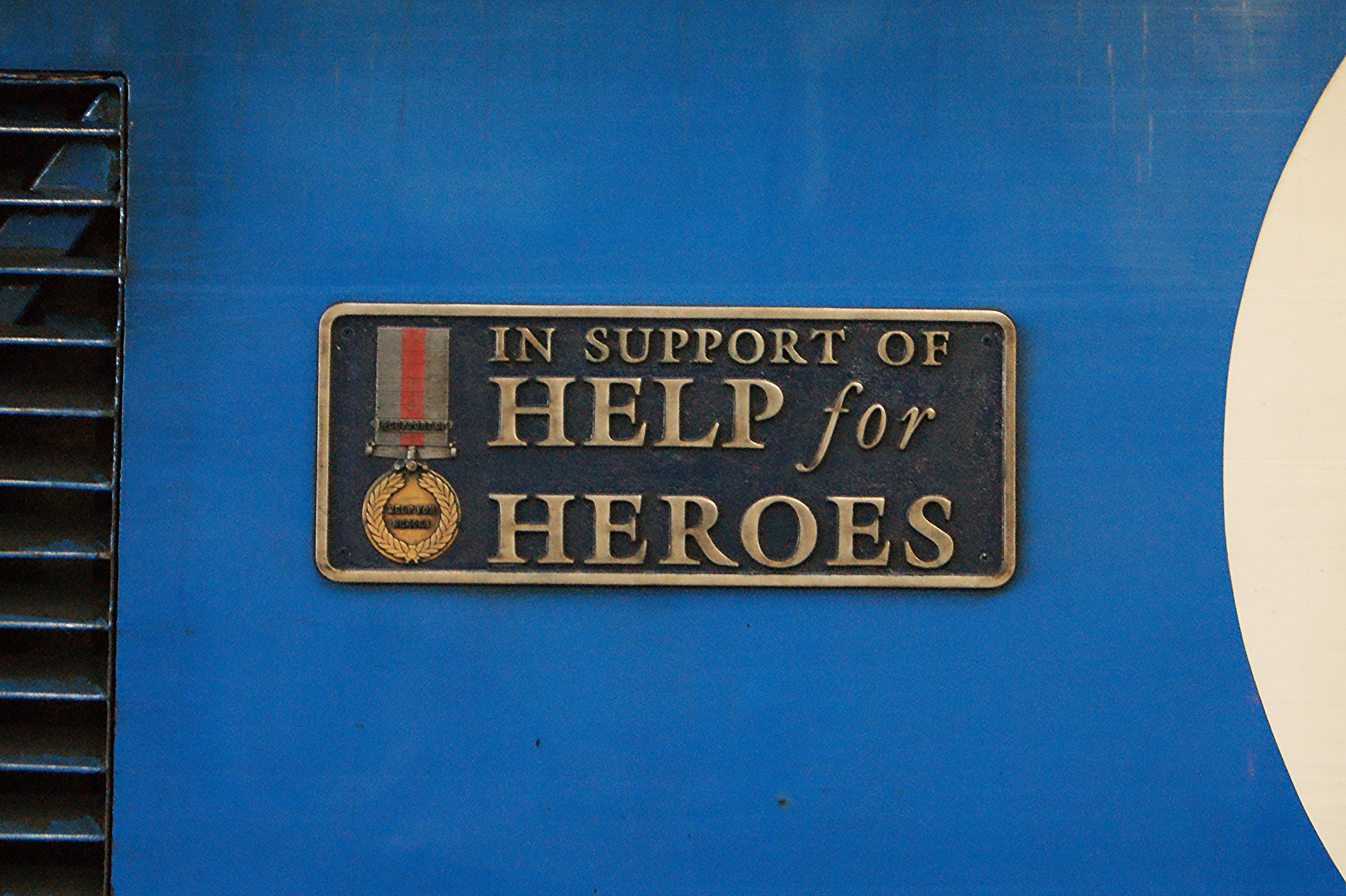
A British Rail Class 43 locomotive with its nameplate declaring support for Help for Heroes

Help for Heroes is a British charity which supports members of the British Armed Forces community with their physical and mental health, as well as their financial, social and welfare needs. The charity was founded in 2007 by Bryn and Emma Parry after they visited soldiers at Selly Oak Hospital in Birmingham. The charity now supports all veterans, serving personnel, those who have served alongside the UK military, and their families.

Help for Heroes has supported more than 28,500 individuals since 2007 through its physical, psychological, financial, educational, sports, fellowship, and welfare support services. The charity's work is almost entirely funded by public donations.

== History ==
Help for Heroes was co-founded by husband and wife, Bryn and Emma Parry, in October 2007 after a meeting with General Sir Richard Dannatt, Chief of the General Staff, the then professional head of the British Army. Bryn had served with the Royal Green Jackets for 10 years, before leaving to become a cartoonist. The couple visited Selly Oak Hospital in July 2007, where they met servicemen and women who had been injured in the wars in Iraq and Afghanistan. They decided they needed to do something to help.

Initially the couple wanted to raise funds for a dedicated swimming pool for injured veterans at Headley Court Defence Medical Rehabilitation Centre in Surrey. However, within two months they had raised over £2 million, and the charity expanded to support more veterans with their recovery. They also attracted support from national newspapers in the United Kingdom, such as The Sun and The Sunday Times who made the charity one of the beneficiaries of their Christmas appeal in 2007, raising more than £600,000. Bryn and Emma Parry were both appointed OBEs in the Queen's Birthday Honours for their services to charity on 25 November 2010, and Bryn was awarded the CBE in February 2023.

In May 2013, Help for Heroes experienced a sharp rise in donations following the murder of Fusilier Lee Rigby in Woolwich, London. Rigby had been wearing a Help for Heroes sweatshirt when he was attacked. The charity received over £600,000 in donations in the week following his death.

In November 2016, Melanie Waters, former chief executive of The Poppy Factory, became the chief executive of the charity when Bryn Parry stood down after nine years in charge.

In 2020, the charity was forced to make 110 redundancies due to a rise in demand and a sharp fall in donations as a result of the Covid-19 pandemic.

The charity helped train, select and deliver Team UK to the first Invictus Games held in London in 2014. It continued to support Team UK at the following four Invictus Games. In May 2022, the Ministry of Defence accepted a proposal from the Royal British Legion to lead the end-to-end delivery of Team UK for the following five years, ending Help for Heroes’ involvement with the Invictus Games.

In September 2022, chief executive Melanie Waters announced that she was leaving the charity after more than five years in charge. The charity's deputy CEO James Needham was appointed chief executive on an interim basis, before being appointed as the charity's permanent CEO in March 2023.

== Recovery centres ==
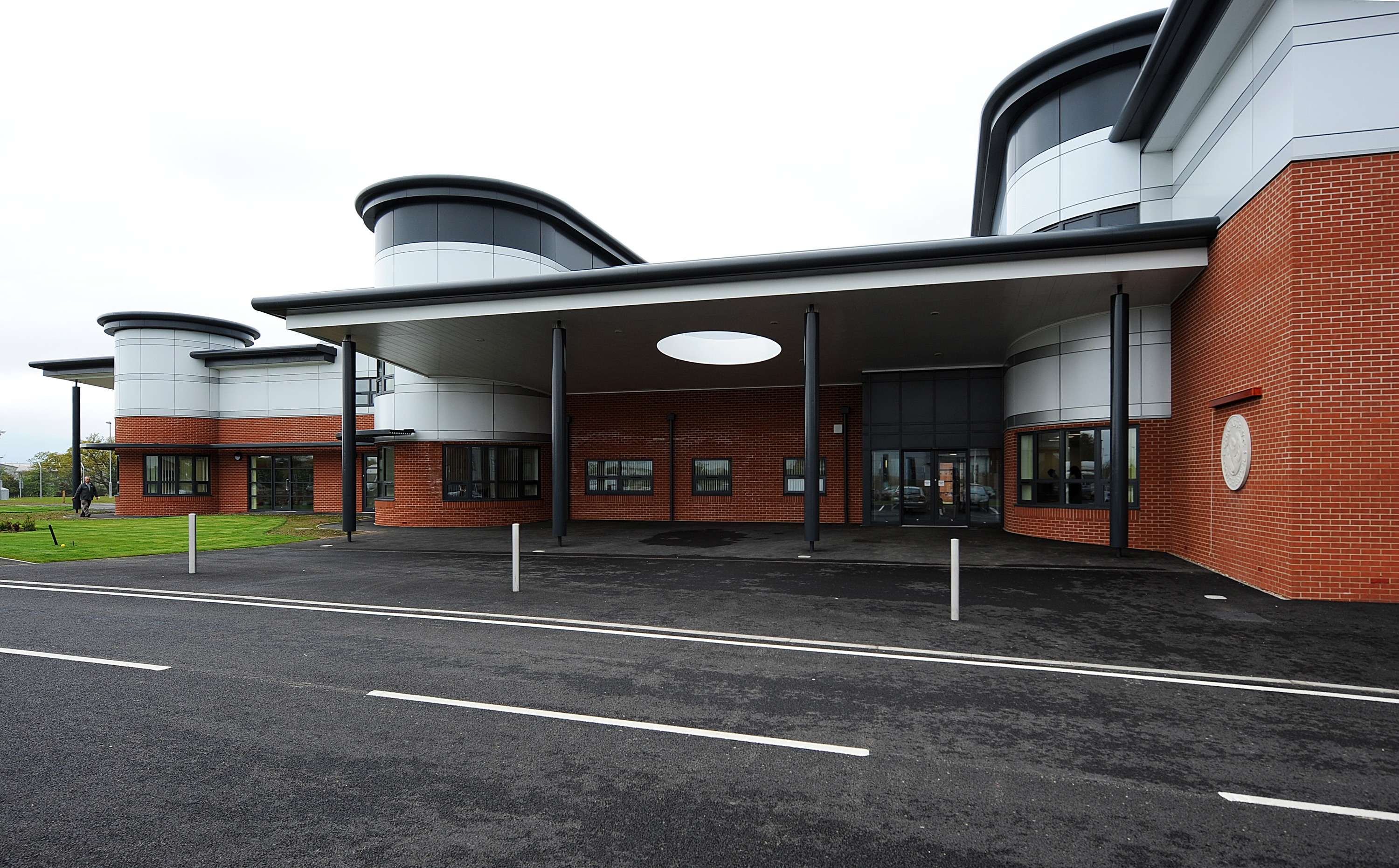
Chavasse VC House Personnel Recovery Centre, Colchester, is owned by the Ministry of Defence (MoD), but its construction and operation are funded in part by Help for Heroes.

In partnership with the Ministry of Defence (MoD) and The Royal British Legion (RBL), Help for Heroes runs four recovery centres: Tedworth House (Tidworth, Wiltshire), Chavasse VC House (Colchester, Essex), Naval Service Recovery Centre (Plymouth, Devon), and Phoenix House (Catterick, North Yorkshire). Each centre is a location for the Defence Recovery Capability programme. Participants in the programme receive coordinated medical, psychological, and welfare support, designed to help them overcome sickness and injury, and ultimately return to active duty, or transition to civilian life.

In September 2020, due to the financial strain of the COVID-19 pandemic, Help for Heroes announced that it was closing three of its recovery centres for the foreseeable future (Catterick, Plymouth and Colchester), and would instead be focusing on digital and community recovery delivery.

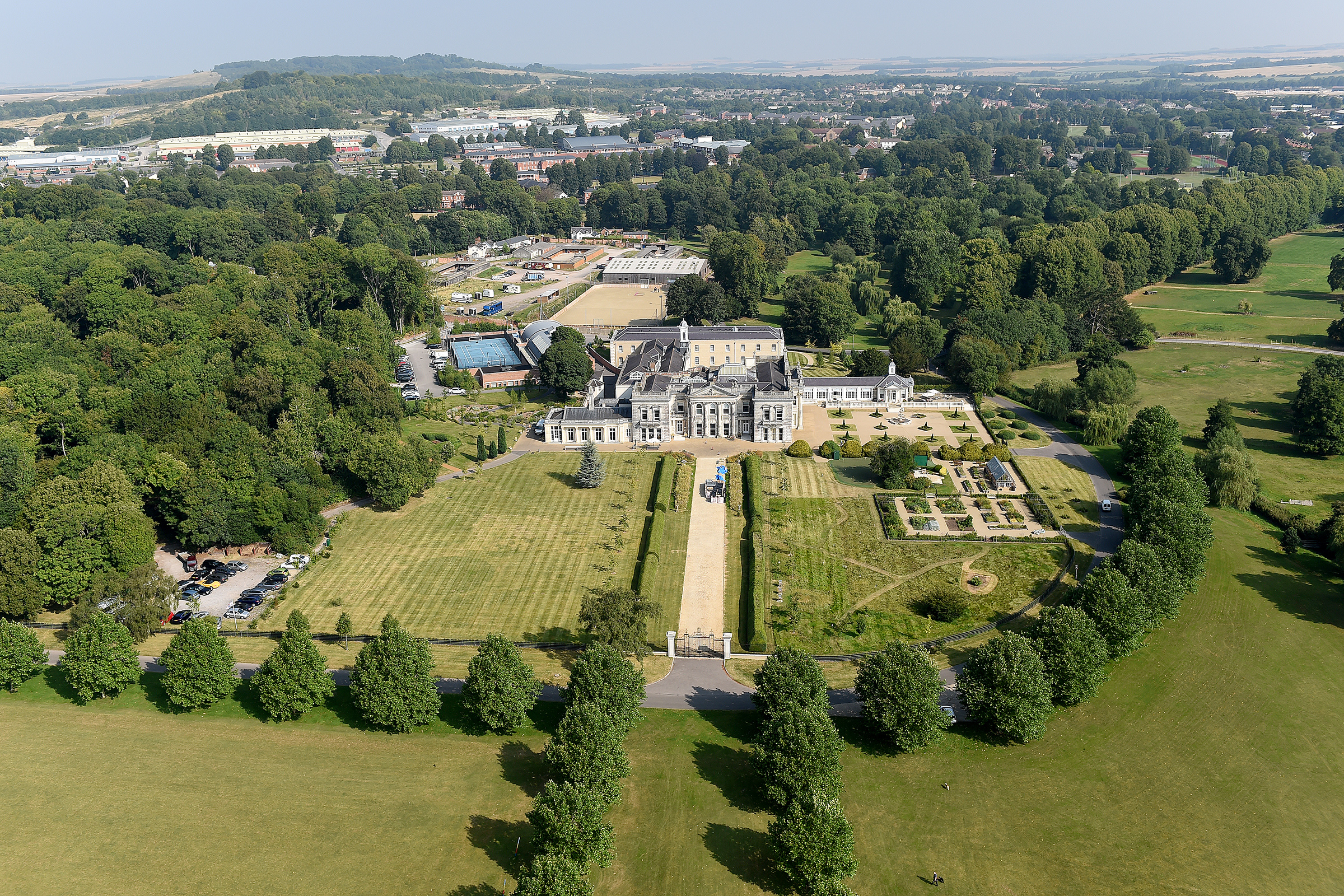
Tedworth House, near Tidworth, Wiltshire, is one of the MoD Recovery Centres, with Help for Heroes providing major funding for all of the recovery support programmes.

== Recovery Support ==
Help for Heroes delivers its one-to-one recovery support as follows:

· Psychological support – the Hidden Wounds service offers assessment and treatment for mental health difficulties. The team of trained clinicians provide a range of treatments including cognitive behavioural therapy and counselling.

· Welfare Support – the case management team works with individuals and families with several or complex needs. They offer advice and guidance on a range of welfare issues, such as money, health, housing, and benefits.

· Veterans Clinical Liaison Team – the team is made up of registered nurses, occupational therapists and medical advisors. They work with men and women with physical health challenges, helping them access specialist therapies, get clinical equipment and to re-engage with the community.

· Very Seriously Injured Programme – the programme supports men and women living with catastrophic injuries who need round-the-clock care; the charity helps them gain access to support such as speech and language therapy, financial assistance with carer costs, and specialist equipment.

· Grants Team – grants can be awarded to those in need of urgent financial support for their recovery.

· Sport, Activity and Fellowship Team – the team offers a wide range of free sporting, recreational and social activities across the UK to help people improve their wellbeing and to reduce isolation. They also provide bespoke physical fitness support.

In September 2020, the charity launched its virtual Recovery College, the first of its kind specially designed for and by veterans and their families. All educational modules are designed to enable veterans to take ownership of their recovery.

== Sports recovery programme ==
Help for Heroes has been involved with sport recovery since 2008, giving those supported by the charity access to a number of different sports, enabling wounded, injured, and sick service personnel, and veterans to take part in adaptive sports. Its sport services offer a broad range of activities out in the community and at all ability levels, from recreational to competitive.

Help for Heroes has worked in partnership with the British Paralympic Association, UK Sport, the English Institute of Sport to introduce military personnel and veterans to Paralympic sport through its ‘Front Line to Start Line’ programme.

In collaboration with UK Coaching, the charity launched a pilot Coaching Academy programme in 2022, giving veterans the chance to train for a sport coaching qualification and build on their skills in civilian life.

== Invictus Games ==
Help for Heroes was responsible for the training, selection, and development of Team UK in the first four editions of the Invictus Games: 2014 (London), 2016 (Orlando, Florida, USA), 2017 (Toronto, Ontario, Canada), and 2018 (Sydney). Help for Heroes worked in partnership with the Ministry of Defence and the Royal British Legion to support the UK team. The charity was to deliver and train the 65-strong team at the 2020 Invictus Games in the Hague, which was postponed to 2022 due to the COVID-19 pandemic. In May 2022, it was announced that the Ministry of Defence had accepted a proposal from the Royal British Legion to lead the end-to-end delivery of Team UK for the following five years, ending Help for Heroes' eight-year association with the Invictus Games.

== Grants ==
Help for Heroes previously grant funded more than 90 specialist charities and organisations; including Winston's Wish, The Poppy Factory, Blesma and Combat Stress. The charity now focuses its financial support in the form of individual grants to wounded personnel, veterans and families. In 2019, the charity awarded 819 such grants, totalling £703,000, and taking the life-to-date awards total to 12,969. In 2022, the charity introduced immediate needs grants to help individuals with food and energy bills in response to the cost-of-living crisis.

The oldest person to receive support from the charity was Second World War veteran Robbie Clarke, who was 96 when he received an emergency grant in 2015, to ensure he could remain living at home.

== Finances ==
Over 90 per cent of the charity's income is from public donations. Its main sources of income are legacies, regular giving, grants, trading, and fundraising events and challenges.

In September 2020, the charity announced that its income was falling due to the COVID-19 pandemic. In response, it launched an urgent appeal in October 2020, raising more than £150,000 in donations.

In the 2020/21 financial year, Help for Heroes reported an income of £18.5 million (higher than its target of £17.3 million) and expenditure of £36.3 million.

== Events and Challenges ==
Help for Heroes offers a range of fundraising challenges and events including bike rides in the UK and Europe, Skydives, marathons, walks, and treks to Nepal and Machu Pichu.

=== The Big Battlefield Bike Ride ===
The Big Battlefield Bike Ride is the charity's largest fundraising event. The first edition of the challenge was held in May 2008 when 300 cyclists biked from HMS Victory at Portsmouth to Northern France, tracing some of the region's most significant First World War and Second World War battle sites, and returned to the Cenotaph in London. There have been 11 further bike rides, cycling a total of 3,000 miles and raising around £10 million for the charity.

=== Supporters' events ===
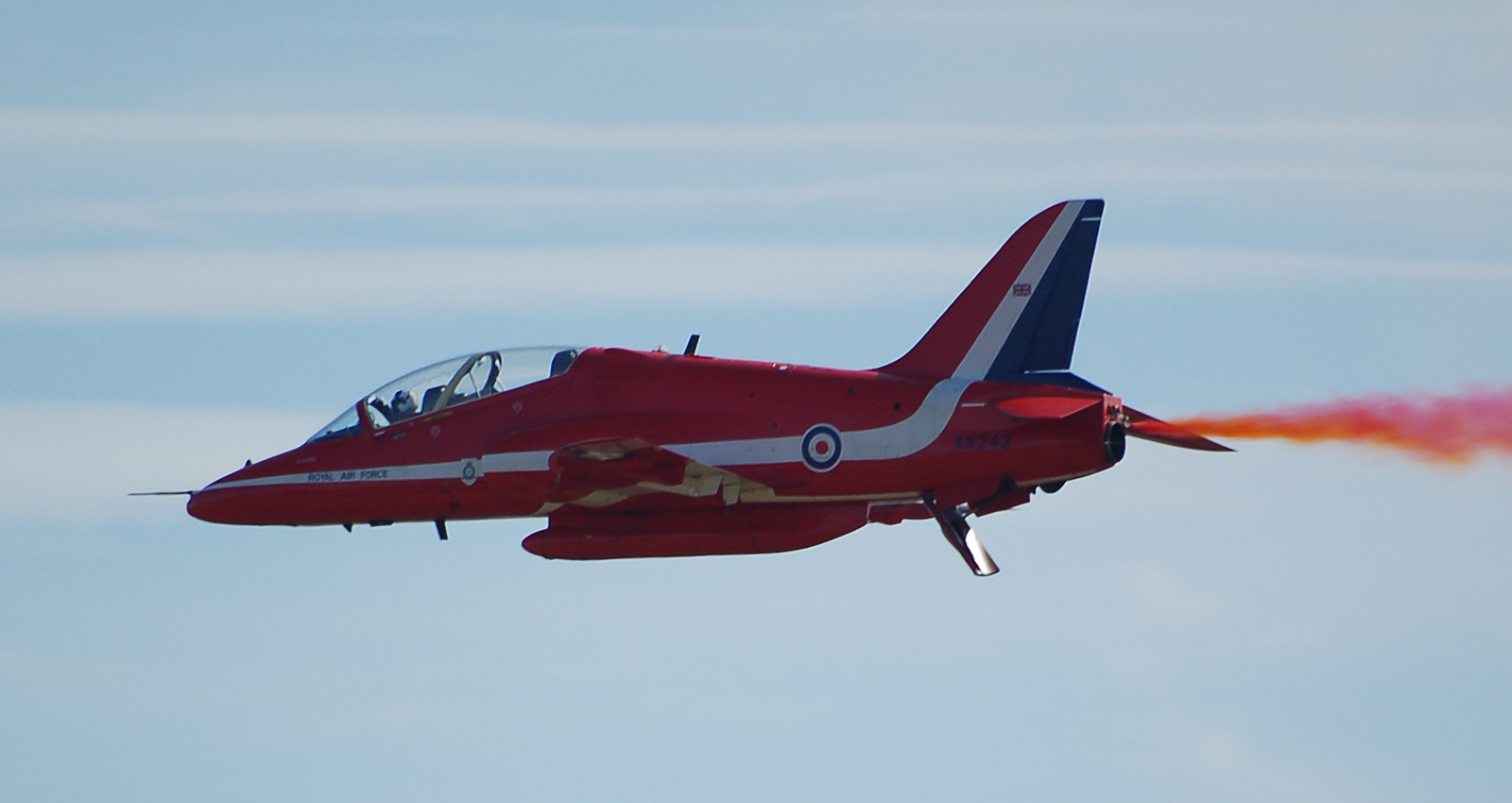
Hawk T1 of the Royal Air Force Red Arrows

On 5 September 2008, H4H held a Heroes Ball to raise funds. A charity auction included a Royal Air Force (RAF) donated prize to fly with the Red Arrows, the RAF's aerobatics team. The winning bid was £1.5 million which gave the winner, Julie Heselden, the chance for her and eight family members to fly in the team's Hawk jets. The RAF said of the bid, "We know it is a special prize – a once in a lifetime opportunity – but we are all astounded that someone could be so generous. The RAF is genuinely delighted to have helped in raising such a fantastic amount of money for such a worthwhile charity."

=== City Salute ===
The charity was a joint beneficiary of a pageant held on 8 May 2008 in London, hosted by patron of the charity Jeremy Clarkson, and attended by Princes William and Harry, who were both members of the British Armed Forces.

=== Sporting challenges ===
On 20 September 2008, Twickenham Stadium hosted a rugby union challenge match, featuring rugby players from around the world which raised £1.1 million, and was televised live. The match featured a Help for Heroes XV and an International Select XV. Former England captains Phil de Glanville and Lawrence Dallaglio acted as team manager and captain respectively for the Help for Heroes XV, with Welsh rugby players Ieuan Evans and Scott Gibbs filling the same roles for the International Select XV. The teams included players from the Guinness Premiership, National Division One, the Celtic League, overseas players, and players from the Armed Forces. The Help for Heroes XV won the match 29–10 in front of a crowd of 52,254, which included The Prince of Wales and The Duchess of Cornwall. Performing at the event were the Band of the Royal Hospital School, Blake, Escala, and the Royal Marines Commandos abseil team.

A second rugby match, 'The Heroes Rugby Challenge' was played on 3 December 2011 at Twickenham Stadium. The match featured Lawrence Dallaglio, Jason Leonard, and Ieuan Evans managing the Northern Hemisphere XV against a Southern Hemisphere team, coached by Wayne Smith and Nick Mallett and overseen by Michael Lynagh and Sean Fitzpatrick.

On 12 November 2009, a football match was held at the Madejski Stadium in Reading, Berkshire, between an England XI team and a Rest of the World XI team, playing for the Heroes Cup. The teams comprised ex-professional footballers, other sportspersons and celebrities, and footballing members of the Armed Forces. The match was broadcast live on ITV4 and British Forces Broadcasting Service (BFBS), and was commentated on by Peter Drury and Joe Royle. The Rest of the World beat England 4–1.

=== The X Factor charity single ===
In October 2010, it was announced that the finalists of the seventh series of The X Factor would be recording a version of David Bowie's 1977 song Heroes. The song was released in aid of H4H and the Royal British Legion. All sixteen finalists of Series 7 performed the song on 20 November 2010's results show. In the first week of its release, it went straight to number 1, and sold 313,244 copies, more than the rest of the top ten at the time combined.

British Chancellor of the Exchequer Alistair Darling announced he would effectively waive VAT on the single, by donating the value of the VAT paid on the single to the charity. He said "I very much support the Help for Heroes campaign and I support too the efforts being made by the X Factor contestants, and in recognition of that I am proposing effectively to waive VAT on this sale of these singles."

=== Help for Heroes Concert 2010 ===
This was held on 12 September 2010 at Twickenham Stadium in London, and featured, among others, Robbie Williams, Gary Barlow, Peter Kay, Tom Jones, and Pixie Lott. The concert was shown live on BBC One, and was presented by Cat Deeley.

=== Convoy for Heroes ===
At Easter 2011, the first Convoy for Heroes event took place at Gaydon in Warwickshire, to raise money for Help for Heroes. Organised by Land Rover enthusiasts, Convoy for Heroes took the form of a world-record breaking convoy of 348 Land Rovers, including SAS 'Pink Panther' Land Rovers, and several SAS troops themselves. A second Convoy for Heroes event was held over Easter 2012, this time at the larger Prestwold Hall site in Leicestershire.

=== 4x4 European Rally ===
The Help for Heroes 4x4 European Rally is an annual non-speed battlefield touring assembly that takes place in June. The event has raised over £1 million for the charity. Starting in England, it covers 2,000 miles and seven countries in twelve days, visiting World War I and II battlefields and museums. It is open to 45 teams of road-legal off-road-capable vehicles, with at least two drivers per team.

== Trustees ==
The Help for Heroes Board of Trustees, who work in an unpaid, voluntary capacity, are responsible for the overall control and strategic direction of the charity. The chair of the trustees is Nigel Boardman, a former partner at corporate law firm Slaughter and May.

== Ambassadors and patrons ==
The charity's ambassadors include a range of veterans, serving personnel, and family members who speak on behalf of the charity. Its patrons include:

- General Sir Richard Dannatt – former professional head of the British Army.
- Ross Kemp – English actor, television presenter and journalist, who has spent time with British troops in Afghanistan filming Ross Kemp in Afghanistan.
- Gareth Southgate – former professional football player and football manager who managed the England national team from 2016 until 2024.
- Anthony Cotton – English actor who became a patron after one of his friends returned home from serving abroad in need of support.
- James Blunt — English singer-songwriter who served in the British Army from 1996 to 2001, being deployed with NATO during the Kosovo War in 1999.
- Lorraine Kelly – Scottish television presenter and journalist.
- JJ Chalmers – Scottish television presenter and Invictus Games medallist who served in the Royal Marines for nine years.
- Andy McNab – former soldier in the Royal Green Jackets and then the SAS with whom he served in the Gulf War. He commanded the Bravo Two Zero patrol in January 1991 and has since written a number of books, and appeared in Andy McNab's Tour of Duty, a documentary television series about the War in Afghanistan, and the Iraq War in 2008.
- Jane Moore – English journalist, author and television presenter.
- Mark and Peta Cavendish – British professional cyclist and his wife Peta who have joined the charity on the Big Battlefield Bike Ride.
- Lucy Wyndham-Read – English personal trainer and fitness expert who served in the British Army for five years.
- Ken Hames – a former SAS officer who now works as a television presenter and motivational speaker.

== Criticism ==
In August 2012, a group of wounded ex-servicemen, featured in a report for BBC's Newsnight, criticised Help for Heroes for its relationship to the Ministry of Defence (MOD). The charity was alleged to have used funds to subsidise expensive MOD buildings, rather than for soldiers' everyday care. The charity had agreed to spend £153 million on constructing and running five regional MOD Personnel Recovery Centres, primarily for serving military personnel, which discharged servicemen could only use on a case-by-case basis. A subsequent investigation by the BBC's Editorial Complaints Unit into the original Newsnight report upheld the charity's complaint about the programme and concluded that "there was no evidence to back Newsnight's claim about Help for Heroes". The BBC issued an official apology in May 2013, but the BBC journalist who compiled the report stood by his findings and the source's legitimacy.

=== Tedworth House Recovery Centre ===
A review by the Charity Commission in 2016 found that Help For Heroes had paid £158,000 to settle employment claims over the previous four years. The review was launched after bullying allegations emerged at the Tedworth House recovery centre in Wiltshire. The Commission concluded that proper procedures were followed, and funds were used correctly.
