= Winston's Wish =

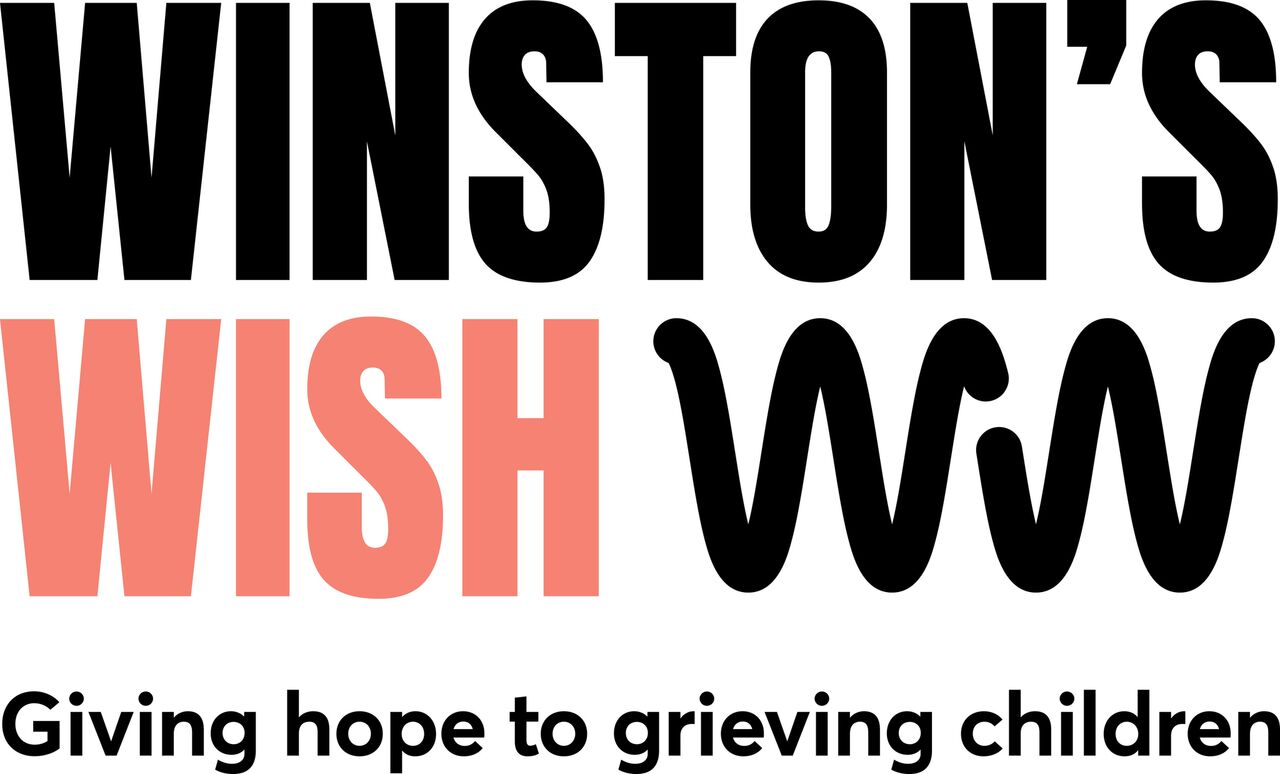
- Founded: 1992
- Founder: Julie Stokes
- Type: Charity
- Purpose: Childhood bereavement
- Location: Cheltenham, Gloucestershire, England
- Region served: United Kingdom
- Services: Charitable services
- Employees: 53
- Volunteers: 250
- Website: winstonswish.org

Winston's Wish is a childhood bereavement charity in the UK. The charity offers a wide range of practical support and guidance to bereaved children, their families and professionals. The charity currently supports 40,000 bereaved children and young people per year.

== Services ==
Winston's Wish provides professional therapeutic help in individual, group and residential settings, and via a national helpline, interactive website and publications.

The charity is the only specialist national provider of support for children bereaved through murder, manslaughter, suicide, military or hard to reach families.

Winston's Wish also operate SWITCH, a community outreach bereavement support service for vulnerable children and young people aged between 8–14. The service is targeted at vulnerable children who are bereaved of a parent/carer, grandparent or sibling.

== History ==
Winston's Wish was set up in 1992 to meet the needs of bereaved children, young people and their families. The idea took root when clinical psychologist, Julie Stokes, visited the US and Canada on a Winston Churchill Travelling Fellowship. Having been inspired by the services she saw there, Stokes returned to the UK and set up Winston's Wish. ‘Churchill’ quickly metamorphosed into ‘Winston’ – a bear – who became the charity mascot. Therefore, the charity believes it is Winston's ‘wish’ that every bereaved child should receive the help they need to cope with the death of someone important in their lives.

In 1992, Winston's Wish founded to meet the needs of bereaved children in Gloucestershire. Within two years, the service expanded to local schools. In 2000, the charity received funding from the Diana, Princess of Wales Memorial Fund for the development of an interactive website aimed at 12- to 18-year-olds. In 2005, the charity launched a national service for children affected by murder, manslaughter or suicide. This was followed in 2006 by the opening of an office in West Sussex. In 2010, the national service launched supporting bereaved children of military families thanks to funding from Help for Heroes.

The charity celebrated its twentieth anniversary in 2012 and had funding awarded by Big Lottery Fund for a new service targeted at bereaved teenagers at risk of offending. This came to fruition in 2013 with the launch of new teenagers bereavement service, ‘SWITCH’. In the same year, the charity launched a fundraising appeal to provide support services in the Wigan and Greater Manchester areas.

== Awards ==
Winston's Wish has been the recipient of a number of awards since the charity was launched.

- 1995: BT/ChildLine Award for providing "outstanding services to children".
- 1999: Guardian Jerwood Award for community achievement
- 2000: Royal Television Society Award for the BBC Everyman documentary Goodbye, God Bless – a collaboration between the BBC and Winston's Wish.
- 2001: Plain English Campaign award for our booklets about serious illness and suicide.
- 2013: Plain English Campaign award for publications 'You Just Don't Understand' and 'The Family Has Been Informed'.
- 2015: Plain English Campaign award as "Standard Bearers" for the 2013–14 Impact Report.

== Great British Brekkie ==
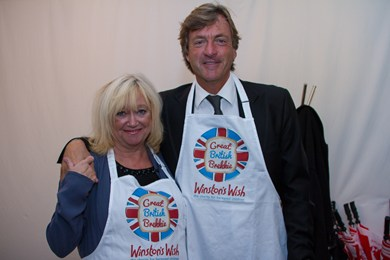
Richard and Judy supporting The Great British Brekkie in 2013.

Since 2012, Winston's Wish has annually hosted The Great British Brekkie, a fundraising campaign which aims to revive the tradition of the Great British breakfast. The campaign attracted celebrity support, notably from Richard and Judy, Ruby Wax, Alexander Armstrong, Rachel Khoo, Cerys Matthews and Ray Mears.

In 2015, the campaign attracted further support from Judi Dench, Jacqueline Wilson, Chris Ramsey, Heston Blumenthal, Jenny Eclair and Sol Campbell.

As part of the campaign, Winston's Wish broke a Guinness World Record for the most soldiers dipping eggy soldiers simultaneously. The official winning title states: ‘The most people dipping egg soldiers simultaneously is 178 and was achieved by soldiers of the Allied Rapid Response Corps at an attempt organised by Winston's Wish at Imjin Barracks, Gloucestershire, UK, on 22 January 2014.’

Readying the 2016 campaign, Winston's Wish has enlisted further support from Alan Davies, Andrew Flintoff, Bill Oddie, Gino D'Acampo and Barenaked Ladies.
