= Murders of Albert Alfonso and Paul Longworth =

Double murders committed in England in 2024

- Date: 8 July 2024
- Location: Shepherd's Bush, London, UK
- Motive: Ambiguous—theft, or fear of being killed in retaliation by one of the victims
- Deaths: 2
- Convicted: Yostin Andres Mosquera
- Verdict: Guilty
- Convictions: Murder (2 counts); Possession of child pornography (3 counts)
- Sentence: Life imprisonment (minimum of 42 years)

On 10 July 2024, suitcases containing human remains were found on Clifton Suspension Bridge in Bristol, in the South West of England, by bystanders who stopped a man acting suspiciously. A manhunt ensued, with police searching for a man in connection with the remains. The man was identified as Colombian national Yostin Andres Mosquera, who was subsequently arrested on 13 July 2024 at Bristol Temple Meads railway station.

It was soon discovered that the murders were committed in London where police found victims' missing body parts. In July 2025 at Woolwich Crown Court, Mosquera was convicted for the double murder.

== Chronology of reports ==
On the evening of 10 July 2024, people leaving a pub in Clifton, Bristol saw three individuals moving two heavy suitcases across the opposite street, with a witness jokingly asking them "That looks really heavy; what have you got in there, a body?" An hour later, a male suspect was reported to the police after acting suspiciously while lugging two suitcases on the Leigh Woods end of the bridge. Having dropped the suitcases after being questioned by bystanders, he ran away and was trailed by a cyclist. Soon after, police arrived with a helicopter being dispatched but did not find the man, who had fled into nearby woodlands. The bridge was then closed for all traffic for the entire day and a police tent erected for forensic examination of the suitcases which were found to contain human remains.

On 12 July, it was reported that the victims were two males, and that the murders were committed in a flat in London where further human remains were subsequently found. The murders were classified as a hate crime based on the fact that the victims had previously been in a relationship. In the morning of the following day, a 34-year-old Colombian national Yostin Andres Mosquera was arrested at Bristol Temple Meads railway station. Mosquera was born in Medellín on 8 March 1990 and worked as a pornographic actor in his native Colombia, as well as in the UK. After meeting Alfonso and Longworth, the couple invited him to London in October 2022, where he remained for a while before returning to live with his wife and son in Colombia. The British couple visited Mosquera in Colombia in March 2024 and invited him again to the UK in June 2024. Mosquera went under different aliases on the internet, selling fetishistic material, including videos with sexual interaction with human faeces, urine, and vomit, which he sold in a range of 25 and 100 US dollars. It was also revealed by the Metropolitan Police that Mosquera researched British serial killers prior to his final arrival in the UK, including the case of Jack the Ripper, as well as information about tools he later used in the dismemberment of the bodies.

On 15 July, Mosquera appeared in court charged with murdering two men, Albert Alfonso (62) and Paul Longworth (71) between 8 and 10 July in the London borough of Hammersmith and Fulham. He was remanded in custody to appear at the Old Bailey on 17 July. At the court hearing on 17 July, he was charged with two counts of murder and remanded in prison to appear at a trial set for 14 April 2025. At further court hearings, Mosquera's trial was moved back to 29 April 2025. and was scheduled to last for three weeks.

== Timeline of trial ==
Trial for the double murder began on 29 April 2025. Initially, Mosquera pleaded guilty for manslaughter, but not murder, and only of Alfonso but not of Longworth. The prosecution rejected his plea, meaning Mosquera faced trial over both killings.

It was revealed that Alfonso had died from at least 13 stab wounds, and Longworth from at least ten blows to the head. Gruesome details emerged about the way Mosquera murdered Alfonso during sexual intercourse which was recorded on camera. Mosquera was accused of dismembering the victims' bodies and freezing some of the body parts. In order to dispose of them, he hired a van, initially to go to Brighton, before changing the destination to Clifton where he intended to dump them off the bridge. Mosquera was also accused of premeditating the murders and trying to steal from the victims' bank accounts afterwards. But he denied killing Longworth, saying that he was killed by Alfonso.

In May 2025, the jury was discharged and the trial stopped because some of the evidence was unclear. A retrial was provisionally scheduled for 30 June 2025, to be held at Woolwich Crown Court in London.

At the repeated trial in July 2025, Mosquera accused Alfonso of raping him, threatening him with harming his family in Colombia, and forcing him to commit sexual acts, the video recordings of which would then be put online. He also stated that he suspected Alfonso had murdered Longworth and that he killed Alfonso preemptively, out of fear that Alfonso might murder him too.

On 21 July 2025, Mosquera was found guilty of murdering Alfonso and Longworth. The judge, Mr Justice Bennathan ordered a psychiatric report to be carried out and that Mosquera would be sentenced on 24 October 2025.

On 24 October 2025, Mosquera pleaded guilty to three counts of possessing child pornography, and was sentenced to life in prison with a minimum of 42 years before parole eligibility, with Justice Bennathan saying that Mosquera may never be released if he does not meet future assessment for release.

== Gallery ==
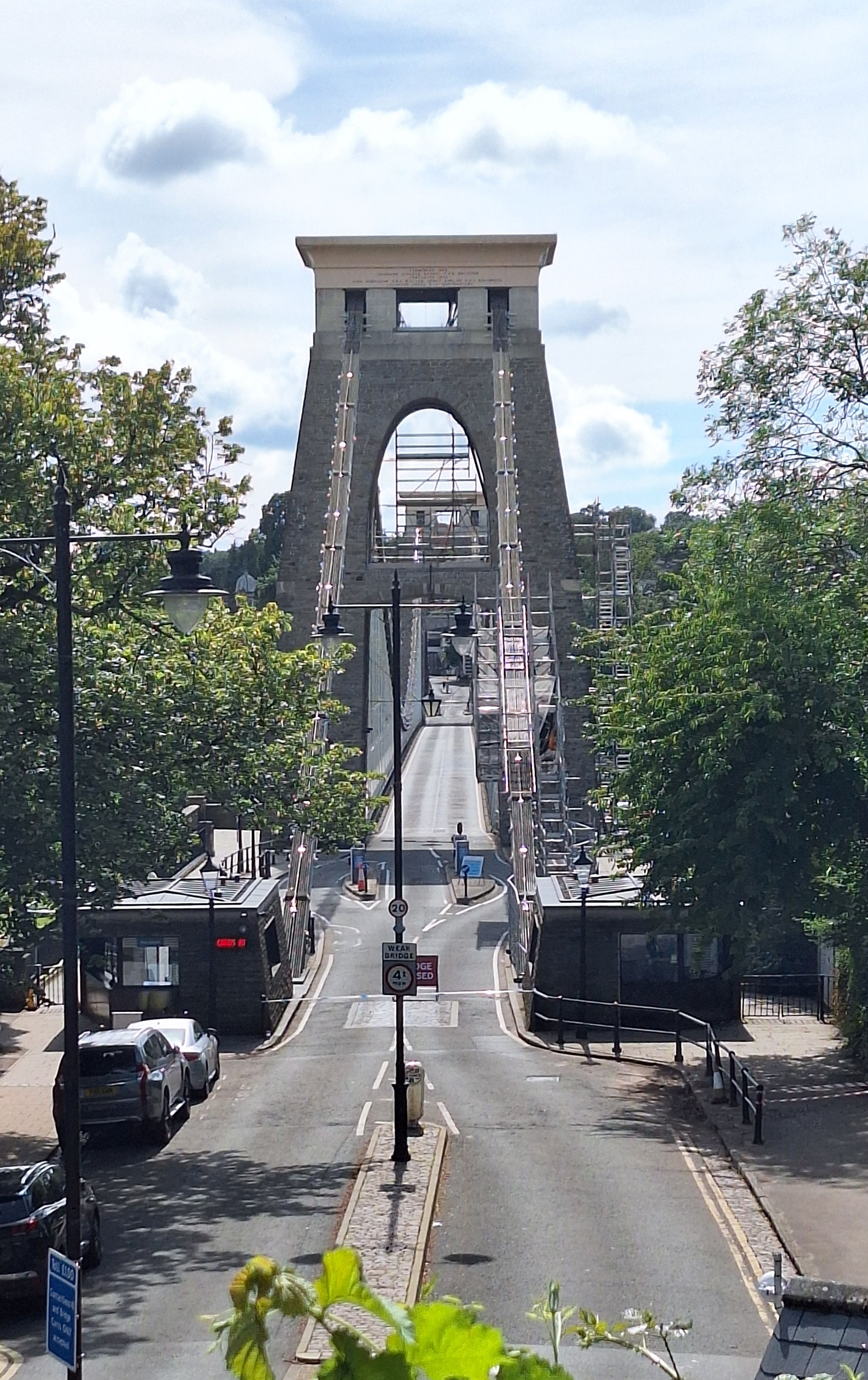
The bridge was closed for traffic during forensic examination on 11 July 2024

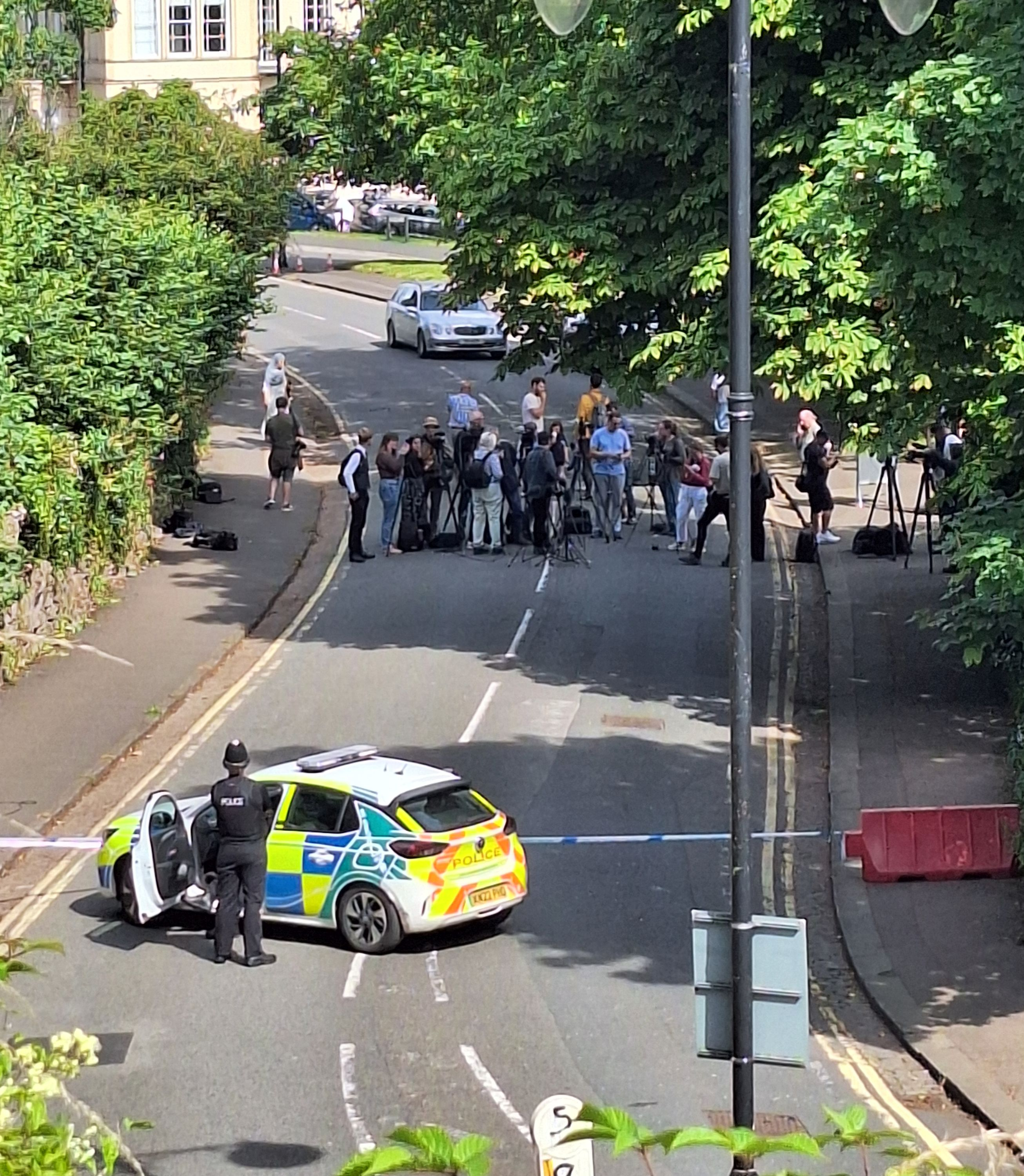
Police blocking access to the bridge while members of the media await a police statement on 11 July 2024
