= ForceSelect =

ForceSelect is a specialist recruitment consultancy for service leavers and ex service personnel. They provide a free mentoring service for those they place into employment to ensure a smooth transition to civilian life and also have a registered charitable foundation aimed at supporting military service leavers and small military charities across the UK. It aims to raise funds to support smaller military charities that are struggling for funds.

It was founded in November 2009 by former Army captain Hugh Andrée. Hugh partnered with General Sir Mike Jackson and Andy McNab to launch the company officially in March 2010.

Most of the recruitment staff are ex-services and partner organisations include Macdonalds, UPS, Mitie, Sir Robert McAlpine, Lloyds Register and many more. It was named one of the brightest new organisations of 2010 by a business survey. The company was awarded the Best New Recruitment company award in 2011, Best Small Company at the Immigration Awards 2013 and was shortlisted for the Best Candidate Care Award in 2014 at the recruitment industry awards.

The Ministry of Defence has given its support to ForceSelect, recognising the work it does to support military service leavers who are looking for a new career on civvy street and by allowing a serving Brigadier to assume a pro bono Advisory role on the Board.

Other directors include former chief of the general staff General Sir Mike Jackson, and bestselling author Andy McNab,

Head of the Trustees is General Sir Mike Jackson.

The ForceSelect Foundation gets its income from a percentage of the profits from the ForceSelect recruitment business as well as a wide range of fundraising activities, such as a collaboration with Lionsgate films for the UK premiere of The Expendables in August 2010.

Military charities across the UK are invited to apply for grants which are awarded by the Board of trustees twice a year.
