= Patric Gagne =

American author and therapist

Patric Gagne (/ˈpætrɪk ˈɡæɡniː/ PAT-rik GAG-nee) is an American therapist and author, known for her 2024 memoir Sociopath, winner of The British Book Awards 2025 Book of the Year - Audiobook Non-Fiction.

In Sociopath, Gagne details her life as a woman diagnosed as a sociopath (a term since abandoned and recategorized as a subset of antisocial personality disorder). She also discusses the clinical side of sociopathy, drawing from her personal experiences, work, research, and doctoral dissertation.

The January 17, 1977 issue of the magazine People includes a November 1976 photo of Gagne with Ringo Starr.

Gagne says she was evaluated in college using the PCL-R and met the criteria for traits consistent with the disorder. She completed her BA at UCLA, her MA in psychology at California Graduate Institute, and her doctorate in clinical psychology at The Chicago School.

She lives with her husband, David Gagne, and their two children.

== See also ==
- Confessions of a Sociopath, 2013 memoir by M. E. Thomas, a pseudonymous law professor
