= Robert Rigby =

British writer

Robert Rigby began his career as a journalist, then spent several years in the music business as a songwriter and session musician. In 1978, the independent record label Flight, released a single by Rigby and the following year Fusion Records (a subsidiary of Rediffusion) released the "Let The Music Play" single. Around this time Rigby also wrote the Rock Star musical, based on the Nativity story. This was recorded and released as an album by Fusion records, produced by Daniel Brown and Mike Wade. He turned to writing for radio, television and the theatre, and has also directed and performed in children's theatre throughout the country. He has become an established young people's playwright, and his award-winning work with youth theatre companies has been seen in Britain, Europe, the US and Africa. Rigby wrote the novelizations of the movies, Goal! (film) and Goal II, and his scripts for television include the long-running BBC children's drama series, Byker Grove.

Rigby also co-wrote the Boy soldier series of books with Andy McNab.

== Theatre ==
- My Friend Willy, Y Touring Theatre Company, 2002

== Television and film ==
- Byker Grove, BBC, 2000
- Thomas The Tank Engine, BBC, 2004

== Books and literature ==
- Boy Soldier with Andy McNab, 2005-2007
- Goal, 2005
- Goal II, Living The Dream, 2006.
- Goal: Glory Days, 2009.
