= Bryn Parry =

British cartoonist (1956–2023)

Bryn St. Pierre Parry, CBE (22 September 1956 – 12 April 2023) was a British cartoonist and co-founder of the charity Help for Heroes. He founded Help for Heroes in 2007 with his wife Emma to help wounded military veterans access rehabilitative treatment. He was one of the best-known countryside cartoonists in the United Kingdom, whose work appeared in 12 books and numerous magazines.

== Early life and education ==
Born in Salisbury, Wiltshire, in 1956, Bryn was the son of Robin Parry, a career army officer, and Doreen (née Painter). His father served in Burma with the Ghurkas during the Second World War and was killed in Germany in 1961. Following his father's death, Parry lived on a farm in Cornwall with his mother, brother, and sister. From 1970 to 1974, he was a pupil at Wellington College, receiving a scholarship due to his father's military service.

== Career ==
Parry served in the Royal Green Jackets, now known as The Rifles, for ten years. In 1985, he left the army to become a full-time cartoonist.

In 2016, Parry stepped down as chief executive of Help for Heroes, while remaining an ambassador for the charity.

== Personal life and death ==
Bryn Parry died of pancreatic cancer on 12 April 2023, at the age of 66.

== Honours ==
Bryn and Emma Parry were both appointed Officer of the Order of the British Empire (OBE) in the 2010 Birthday Honours. Bryn Parry was appointed Commander of the Order of the British Empire (CBE) in the 2023 Special Honours, which was presented to him in a private investiture at home due to his terminal illness.
