= Boy Soldier Series =

Series of spy fiction novels

Boy Soldier(Traitor in the US)
- Boy Soldier; Payback; Avenger; Meltdown
- Author: Andy McNab, Robert Rigby
- Country: United Kingdom
- Genre: Spy fiction
- Publisher: Doubleday & co.
- Media type: Print (hardback & paperback)

Boy Soldier is a series of novels written by Andy McNab with the co-operation of Robert Rigby. It tells the story of a boy named Danny Watts and his grandfather Fergus, apparently a rogue ex-SAS soldier.

Danny sets out to find Fergus, who the media papers state betrayed his regiment by taking money while on active operations infiltrating a drug cartel in Colombia. Later in the series, the reader concludes that Fergus was a deniable operator who was caught.

== Series ==
=== Boy Soldier ===
Boy Soldier (Traitor in USA) is the story of Danny's quest to find his grandfather, whom he has never met but has somehow managed to jeopardize his future. During the early 1990s, Fergus was recruited by MI6 to run an undercover operation in the Colombian drug cartels as a 'K', a deniable operative. However, during the op, he discovered that his control officer had betrayed their operations in Colombia in exchange for money. Before he could report, he was ambushed by Columbians and his troop was killed. He was then taken to a prison. He managed to escape back to England where he hid from the mole who planned to find him and kill him to protect himself. Danny finally finds his grandfather, Fergus Watts, with the help of Danny's best friend, Elena is a computer genius and a very intelligent seventeen-year-old. but also discovers that he has become a pawn within somebody else's plot to uncover Fergus. George Fincham worked in Colombia where he was Fergus Watts's control officer. Fergus discovered that Fincham was a mole for the FARC and that he was offering them intelligence in exchange for money. That way, Fincham amassed £15 million. He framed Fergus as a traitor so as to protect himself. Fincham was later promoted to head of the security section within MI6 and used this to hunt down Fergus after he escaped Colombia.

When Danny's world is turned upside down and his life is in danger, it does not end with his escape from the authorities, in fact, it is merely the beginning. Danny Watts however is determined to uncover the truth after discovering that the media published news alleging his grandfather of stealing money while on a covert operation. Elena began helping them again by giving them what they needed and by hacking into George Fincham's e-mail to discover his plans.

Towards the end of the book Fergus is captured by MI6, so Danny, along with Elena and reporter Eddie Moyes, resolves to free him. After successfully breaking in and liberating Fergus, the three of them attempt to escape with the aid of a woman (Marcie Devereaux). In an attempt to make it look like an escape, Fergus (with the consent of Deveraux) punches her in the face, breaking her jaw. Before they can escape the now unneeded distraction by Moyes draws out the MI6 members. Fergus knocks one of them down and steals their gun, promptly a firefight ensues with Moyes being shot and killed. The agents, distracted by Moyes' body, allow Elena, Danny and Fergus to escape.

The last chapter reveals that Danny and Fergus are now fugitives together and running yet another Burger Bar. A conclusion reveals that the woman who Fergus knocked out knows where they are and reveals their location to George Fincham (the traitor, who betrayed Fergus Watts).

=== Payback ===
Payback is the story of Fergus' attempt to discover evidence to prove that he was working as a 'K'. In this book Fergus and Danny are attempting to keep undercover in a foreign country whilst George Fincham's team hunts them down. The story starts as along the news is broadcaster 'teenager suicide bomber' as news is heard that Parliament square was attacked. While that happened Fergues and Danny are in Spain pretending to be tea makers.

=== Avenger ===
Avenger follows Danny, Fergus and Elena trying to unmask the mastermind 'Black Star' behind an increasing number of teenage suicide bombers. Danny and Fergus are in Spain when the bombings begin. Once Fergus gets his name cleared, he and Danny are offered a chance to live a normal life if they take part in the tracking down of 'Black Star' with the help of Elena. The crew are sent to New York but things take a turn for the worse for our characters, leading to the events of 'Meltdown'

=== Meltdown ===
Meltdown tells the story of a new drug called Meltdown which is sold on the streets of London, and could have disastrous consequences.

== Characters ==
=== Danny Watts ===
Danny Watts is the grandson of the SAS veteran Fergus Watts. He is 5 foot 10 inches, has brown hair, blue eyes and has a slim build. His journey sees him, with the help of his friend confront the full salve of MI6's force in his fleeting attempt to rescue his grandfather. While one of the people who helped him was killed, Danny and his grandfather fled to southern Spain. However while there, the pair struggle to bond. Meanwhile, MI6 using intense intelligence resources and activities trace them to Spain where the Watts' security measures are disabled easily under MI6's vastly superior array of reinforcements and weapons. The chase leads them back to London where another frantic fight ensues. Danny, in contrast to the analytical and observant Fergus, often acts rashly despite his rational mind, he is evidenced numerously to allow his emotions to govern his actions, often when his friends are placed at risk for his grandfather .

=== Fergus Watts ===
An SAS veteran, Fergus joined as a boy soldier before being badged into the SAS. He is 5 foot and 11 inches, has grey hair, blue eyes lean and wiry and limps due to bullet wound in right thigh. He was highly decorated and participated in many wars. At 18 years old, he married and had a son. However, he left his family to be with his comrades. Fergus was found by his grandson Danny and by a team of MI6 operatives. He led Danny to safety and started to train him as a boy soldier. Though they were estranged at the beginning, they started to grow closer and Fergus acted as a father figure for both Danny and Elena. After Fincham's death at the hands of Marcie Deveraux, Fergus, Danny and Elena were hired by MI5 to bring down 'Black Star', the mysterious leader of a teenage-suicide bombing network. Fergus's primary concern however remained Danny and Elena's safety and he blackmailed Deveraux by holding all of her information about the op that he threatened to give to the FBI. However, he was unable to save Elena and had to face Danny's anger about it. He was chosen by MI5 to lead the team chosen for the Meltdown operation and had to try to quench Danny's desire for revenge against Deveraux. Fergus is depicted as a surprisingly composed and observant soldier, despite his experiences and severe suffering, though often disregarding Danny's contribution and disgruntled with weighting the responsibility of his grandson, he ultimately comes to accept Danny as his grandson and deeply admire his bravery and love him, this shown during Payback when he is seen to be crying over Danny.

=== Elena Omolodon ===
Is Danny's best friend. When Danny and Fergus were hiding in Spain, she kept in contact with them and kept hoping that they would come back. She helped them break into PJHQ with the help of her father, Joey. However, Marcie Deveraux killed him and planned to do the same with her, Danny and Fergus. She was later sent in undercover by MI5 to bring down 'Black Star' and his terrorist network. However, she was alone, separated from Danny and Fergus, manipulated by Deveraux; she felt very tempted by joining 'Black Star'. Fergus and Danny tried to get her out while Deveraux tried to kill her. Danny got to her first where she told him that she knew that Deveraux had killed her dad and that she wanted revenge. Danny confessed to her that he loved her and that he would help her. However, Elena was killed by Deveraux shortly after. In the next novel, Danny avenged both Elena and Joey by killing Deveraux.

=== Marcie Deveraux ===
An ambitious agent of the Secret Intelligence Service, she was recruited from Cambridge and was quickly promoted and within ten years, was expected to become the head of MI6.

She was George Fincham's second-in-command during the hunt for Fergus Watts but was secretly working undercover for MI6 who knew that Fincham had betrayed MI5 in Colombia and had made £15 million out of it. Deveraux's mission was to find the money and kill Fincham. She saved Fergus and Danny several times but secretly planned to have them killed in the end. After killing Fincham, MI5 chose Deveraux to lead the team that would hunt down 'Black Star'. She separated Danny and Elena but had to face Fergus's blackmail. After killing 'Black Star', she went after a supposed renegade Elena and killed her. Due to her actions, MI5 dismissed her and she returned to MI6. In the last novel, Fergus's operation bumped with hers and they were forced to work together again. In the end, she and Danny were paired to eliminate their target Enver Kubara, the leader of the Meltdown drug cartel. Deveraux killed Kubara but when she tried to kill his daughter Storm, whom Danny had befriended, Danny killed Deveraux for revenge of Elena's death.

Deveraux's autopsy report had shown that rounds from the AK47 used by Kubara's bodyguard, was believed to have been the weapon that killed her. But the investigation didn't reveal the fact that Danny actually fired the weapon.

She was awarded the George Cross posthumously, for her heroic actions in the Meltdown operation.

=== Phil Reddington ===
Phil was an SAS member, but ten years younger than Fergus. He was chosen as Fergus's senior officer during the Meltdown operation where he helped train Danny and lead surveillance on the cartel's movements.

=== Leroy Simmons ===
An MI5 officer, Lee was recommended for the Meltdown strikeforce by the Service. He fostered a friendship with Danny and helped him deal with his training as a boy soldier. Lee proposed that Danny join MI5 after the end of the op. He was badly wounded by a Meltdown user who stabbed him with a knife. He recovered and became Danny's partner at MI5.

=== George Fincham ===
George Fincham was a high-ranking officer in MI6. He worked in Colombia where he was Fergus Watts's control officer. Fergus discovered that Fincham was a mole for the FARC and that he was offering them intelligence in exchange for money. That way, Fincham amassed £15 million. He framed Fergus as a traitor so as to protect himself.

Fincham was later promoted to head of the security section within MI6 and used this to hunt down Fergus after he escaped Colombia.

=== Dudley ===
Dudley is one of the highest-ranking members of MI5 who was the mastermind behind operations 'Payback', 'Black Star' and 'Meltdown', and who had had the ear of every Prime Minister for thirty years.

== Critical reception ==
Claire Rosser noted “McNab and Rigby combined their efforts here with realistic details about covert operations. Rosser's editor disagreed with her, claiming “this is not great literature.” Roger Leslie complimented this book saying “With its brick plot and unpredictable characters, this story rises above many adventure stories.”
