= Nick Stone Missions =

Series of books by Andy McNab

- Author: Andy McNab
- Country: United Kingdom
- Language: English
- Publisher: Transworld Publishers
- Published: February 1998 – current
- Media type: Print

The Nick Stone Missions are a series of action thriller novels written by author Andy McNab, based on his own experiences in the SAS. The first book in the series, Remote Control was published in February 1998 by Transworld Publishers under their Corgi imprint.

== Synopsis ==
The series follows the character of Nick Stone, an ex-military man who previously worked for the SAS, British Intelligence, and an American agency. Stone now works as a paid mercenary, willing to work in even the most difficult circumstances. The series has Stone dealing with assassination, political intrigue, as well as human rights, modern slavery, and prostitution.

== Books ==
- Remote Control (17 February 1998)
- Crisis Four (22 August 2000)
- Firewall (5 October 2000)
- Last Light (1 October 2001)
- Liberation Day (1 October 2002)
- Dark Winter (3 November 2003)
- Deep Black (1 November 2004)
- Aggressor (1 November 2005)
- Recoil (6 November 2006)
- Crossfire (12 November 2007)
- Brute Force (3 November 2008)
- Exit Wound (5 November 2009)
- Zero Hour (25 November 2010)
- Dead Centre (15 September 2011)
- Silencer (24 October 2013)
- For Valour (23 October 2014)
- Detonator (22 October 2015)
- Cold Blood (20 October 2016)
- Line of Fire (19 October 2017)
- Down to the Wire (10 November 2022)

== Adaptations ==
=== Film ===
In 2001 Miramax Films' Bonnie Timmermann purchased the rights to the series with the intention to film the second book in the Nick Stone series, Crisis Four. The film adaptation faced difficulties after the events of 9/11 in the United States, with Miramax stating that they would re-write the movie script to remove mentions of Osama bin Laden. The film rights to the series were later sold to Harvey Weinstein but were repurchased by Timmerman after they lapsed in 2010.

After repurchasing the book rights, Timmermann announced that she would be adapting the book Firewall, with the movie being named Echelon. The script for the movie has been written by McNab and John Connor, with Ashok Amritraj set to co-produce the film with Timmerman. Jason Statham was picked to portray ex-SAS operative Nick Stone, but withdrew from the project due to scheduling issues.

== Reception ==
Critical reception for the series has been mostly positive, with the Irish Independent calling Dead Centre "biff-bang action fiction at its most uncomplicated". The Free Lance-Star positively reviewed the audiobook for Crisis Four, stating that although the narrator's American accent was "unconvincing", his portrayal of the book's characters "sparkle with life". Kirkus Reviews' opinion of the series was predominantly positive, with the site calling Firewall "a sweet one" but stating that reducing Last Light's meticulous details "might have benefited narrative flow".

Of Deep Black, the Harrow Observer described the novel as an "unforgettable story" from its "violent and shocking opening" that includes "vivid, lightning-paced action". A Sunday Times reviewer said that "it's not one of his strongest efforts" and that "too much of the novel consists of aimless linking material or unconvincing attempts at atmosphere". Robert Hanks of The Independent stated that "the plot strains credibility, and the terse, slangy prose is sometimes repetitive".

Publishers Weekly panned both Last Light and Liberation Day, saying of Liberation Day that "Instead of biting their nails, readers will be staring at them absently, bored by the colorless plot". Reviewers for the company also reviewed Firewall and Crisis Four, praising both entries in the series.

=== Controversy ===
The paperback release of Crisis Four briefly suffered poor sales in the United States due to the book being released the week before the events of the September 11 attacks and McNab using bin Laden as the book's villain. McNab explained the usage of bin Laden as the villain, stating that "This guy's been out there for about 10 years, insane and doing his thing in the darkness ... the war against him has been going on for a long time."

McNab faced criticism for using product placement in his novel Liberation Day, with Brand Republic reporting that the author inserted "more than 60 references to Traser watches" into the text.
