= The Good Psychopath's Guide to Success =

2014 book by Kevin Dutton and Andy McNab

- Author: Dr. Kevin Dutton, Andy McNab
- Illustrator: Rob Murray
- Language: English
- Genre: Self-help
- Published: 2014
- Publisher: Transworld Publishers
- Publication place: United Kingdom
- Pages: 381
- ISBN: 978-0-552-17106-9

The Good Psychopath's Guide to Success is a self-help book co-authored by the British authors Dr. Kevin Dutton and Andy McNab. The book's premise is that certain traits found in psychopaths can be helpful to someone's personal life. The book describes these traits and tries to explain to the reader how they can be applied to day-to-day life.

== Reception ==
The book was the subject of articles in the NPR and The Daily Telegraph.
