= London Early Years Foundation =

Charity running child nurseries

- Formation: 1903; 123 years ago
- Founder: Margaret Horn
- Type: Charitable organisation Social enterprise
- Registration no.: England and Wales: 299686
- Headquarters: 121 Marsham Street, London, England SW1P 4LX
- Region served: London
- Key people: June O'Sullivan (CEO)
- Revenue: £24.92 million (2019/20)
- Employees: 789 (2019/20)
- Website: leyf.org.uk
- Formerly called: City of Westminster Health Society (1903–1977); Westminster Children's Society (1977–2009)

The London Early Years Foundation (LEYF) is a British charitable organisation and social enterprise which works in the field of early childhood education. Founded in 1903 as the City of Westminster Health Society primarily focused on health visiting services for parents, the organisation today operates 42 nurseries and pre-schools across London, primarily in disadvantaged areas. Since 2004, June O'Sullivan has been CEO of LEYF.

== History ==
LEYF was founded in 1903 as the City of Westminster Health Society by Margaret Horn MBE along with a committee, with the aim of "combat[ing] the continuing rise of maternal and infant mortality rates". Horn MBE was the secretary of the organisation from 1906 to 1912, then became the first organising secretary from 1912 to 1946. The organisation is credited with introducing the first health visiting programme to London, opening several clinics focused on improving the welfare of children and their parents in the city. During the Second World War, the Society opened the first nurseries to support mothers who found themselves working to contribute to the war efforts. This led to a change in emphasis for the organisation, which began to focus more on early years education and care, and in 1977 it changed its name to the Westminster Children's Society (WCS). After expanding beyond the Westminster area of London and increasing its work in other areas such as training and research, WCS was rebranded as the London Early Years Foundation (LEYF) in 2009.

== Nurseries ==
According to the LEYF official website, the organisation currently runs 42 nurseries across London. At the time of the organisation's 2019/20 annual report, 97% of its nurseries were rated 'good' or 'outstanding' by Ofsted, including 59% outstanding compared with the national average of 20%.

== Teaching ==
LEYF's pedagogy, which directs the organisation's approach to teaching, is a seven-strand model which aims to "ensure that children from all communities, but especially those from poorer neighbourhoods, can and do access high-quality nurseries". The programme incorporates all the statutory requirements of the Early Years Foundation Stage (EYFS) framework.
