= June O'Sullivan =

Dr June O'Sullivan OBE
- Education: University of Roehampton; London South Bank University
- Employer: London Early Years Foundation

June O'Sullivan is an Irish social entrepreneur, campaigner and author best known for her work in early childhood education. Since 2004, she has been chief executive officer (CEO) of the London Early Years Foundation (LEYF). She is also a fellow of the Royal Society of Arts, director at Social Enterprise UK, and trustee at London-based children's reading charity BookTrust.

== Career ==
O'Sullivan first joined LEYF in 1996 after obtaining a master's degree in Primary Education from the University of Roehampton, before taking over as CEO in 2004. Her work at LEYF has been recognised as helping "the educational development of socially disadvantaged children in their early years." Under O'Sullivan, LEYF has grown to become a network of 43 nurseries employing over 900 staff across London, making it one of the city's largest charitable social enterprises. Recognition of LEYF has included winning Transformational Change of the Year at the 2012 National Business Awards, Nursery Chain of the Year at the 2014 Nursery World Awards, and Group of the Year at the 2015 Nursery Management Today Awards.

In conjunction with her work at LEYF, O'Sullivan has campaigned on a number of early childhood education issues. In 2013 she founded the Ofsted Big Conversation, which works to establish mutually beneficial dialogue between early years childcare providers and Ofsted. Working with the University of Wolverhampton, she led an initiative to create a new degree for nursery teachers, known as the LEYF Higher Education Staff Development Programme, which was launched in September 2018. O'Sullivan also formed Men in Childcare London, campaigning to recruit more men into the sector. In 2018 she was appointed by the Mayor of London Sadiq Khan to the board of London's Child Obesity Task Force, and in 2019 launched the Chef Academy to provide training and an accredited qualification to chefs working in nursery settings.

O’Sullivan established the training arm of the London Early Years Foundation in 2004, rebranding it in 2024 as the London Institute of Early Years. The Institute extends access to the LEYF social justice model through high-quality training, continuing professional development (CPD), research, and sector advocacy, supporting the replication of values-led early years practice. Through this work she has contributed to sector collaboration initiatives including communities of practice focused on embedding sustainability and professional learning across early years settings.

== Works ==
O'Sullivan has published and contributed to a number of books on early childhood education.

Her own books include:

- Early Years Managers Handbook (2003)
- Successful Leadership in the Early Years (2015)
- 50 Fantastic Ideas for Nursery Gardens (2018)
- 50 Fantastic Ideas for Engaging Dads (2018)
- The A–Z of Early Years (2020)
- 50 Fantastic Ideas for Sustainability (2021)
- Think Feel Do: A Wellbeing Handbook for Early Years Staff (2022)
- 50 Fantastic Ideas to Encourage Diversity and Inclusion (2022)
- Best Practice in Early Years Supporting Children with a Parent in Prison (2024)

Works to which she has contributed include:

- Wellbeing in the Early Years (2013)
- Sage Handbook of Early Childhood Theories (2018)

== Awards ==
- 2013: MBE for "services to London children"
- 2014: NMT Childcare Power 20 (runner-up)
- 2014: Social Enterprise Awards: Women's Champion of the Year
- 2015: Ernst & Young Entrepreneur of the Year (regional finalist)
- 2015: NMT Childcare Power 20 (runner-up)
- 2017: NMT Top 20 Awards: Most Influential Person in Childcare
- 2018: Veuve Clicquot Social Purpose Business Woman of the Year Award (finalist)
- 2023: OBE for "services to Education"
- 2024: Lifetime Achievement Award, Nursery World Awards
- 2025: WISE100 Women in Social Enterprise Awards – Social Business Woman of the Year
- 2025: LEYF awarded the King's Awards for Enterprise in Sustainable Development, recognising the organisation’s work embedding sustainability and social justice in early years education.
