= Joel Bennathan =

British Judge

The Honourable Mr Justice Bennathan
- Royal coat of arms of the United Kingdom

Justice of the High Court
- Incumbent
- Assumed office 11 January 2022
- Appointed by: Elizabeth II

Personal details
- Born: 15 July 1961 (age 65)
- Education: Queen Mary College

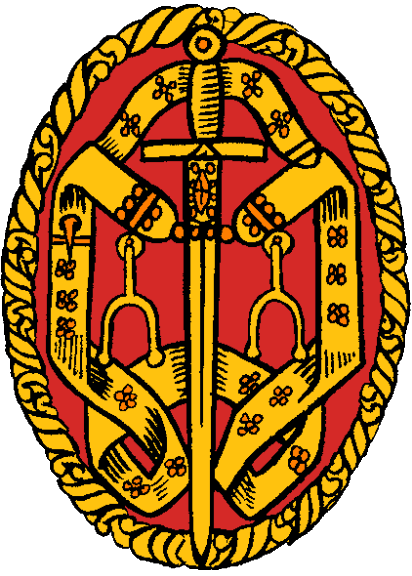

Sir Joel Nathan Bennathan (born 15 July 1961), styled Mr Justice Bennathan, is a British High Court judge.

== Biography ==
Bennathan's father was a German Jew who escaped Nazi Germany. His maternal grandparents worked in mills in Blackburn. He credits these experiences for his abhorrence of racism and snobbery. Educated at Bristol Grammar School, Bennathan went up to Queen Mary College becoming the first lawyer in his family. After being called to the Bar in 1985 at the Middle Temple, he took silk (QC) in 2006.

Before becoming a judge, Bennathan worked in Doughty Street Chambers. Bennathan worked as a defence barrister, specialising in criminal law up until his appointment undertaking a number of high-profile cases.

Appointed a recorder in 2009 to the South Eastern Circuit, Bennathan is a visiting lecturer in Law at London South Bank University.

In January 2019 Bennathan was shortlisted for the 'Crime Silk of The Year' award.

In December 2021, Queen Elizabeth II approved his appointment as a justice of the High Court. Bennathan assumed his position on 11 January 2022 and was assigned to the King's Bench Division, receiving the customary knighthood in July 2023, at Windsor Castle.

== Notable cases ==
- Murders of Albert Alfonso and Paul Longworth
- Russell Brand rape and sexual assaults 2026 trial and conviction
