= Martha Stout =

American psychologist and author (born 1953)

- Born: August 12, 1953 (age 73)
- Education: Stony Brook University (PhD)
- Occupation: Author
- Writing career
- Language: English

Martha Stout (born August 12, 1953) is an American psychologist and author.

== Education, training, and career ==
Stout completed her professional training in psychology at the McLean Psychiatric Hospital and obtained her Ph.D. at Stony Brook University. She served on the clinical faculty of the Harvard Medical School for over 25 years and also served on the academic faculties of The New School for Social Research, the Massachusetts School of Professional Psychology, and Wellesley College. She writes on the subjects of conscience, character, and integrated awareness. Her work in psychology and cultural commentary has appeared in The Boston Globe and HuffPost, and she is a contributing writer for The New Republic. Stout is in private practice as a clinical psychologist in Boston, where she specializes in recovery from psychological trauma, post-traumatic stress disorder and suicide. She resides in the Commonwealth of Massachusetts.

== Books ==
Stout has written a number of books on psychology, translated into many languages, including The Sociopath Next Door: The Ruthless Versus the Rest of Us, The Myth of Sanity: Divided Consciousness and the Promise of Awareness, and The Paranoia Switch: How Fear Politics Rewires Our Brains and Reshapes Our Behavior and How We Can Reclaim Our Courage. In 2005, her book The Sociopath Next Door won the Books for a Better Life Award, Best Book in Psychology.

In The Sociopath Next Door, she advises developing an awareness of the nature of anti-social behavior in order to avoid becoming its victim and proposes 13 rules as self-help guidelines to assessing relationships and behavior for these characteristics, as well as offering advice on handling situations when one encounters anti-social (conscienceless) behavior. She provides the first modern psychological definition of conscience, and clarifies the sustaining nature of conscience in human life. Her book The Myth of Sanity: Divided Consciousness and the Promise of Awareness concerns psychological trauma and dissociation (fragmented awareness) in everyday life, and steps to the reintegration of awareness. In The Paranoia Switch, which concerns the behavioral and neurological effects of fear politics, she coins the term "limbic war", and discusses the relationship between recovery from psychological trauma and the development of courage.

== Works ==
- 2001 — The Myth of Sanity: Divided Consciousness and the Promise of Awareness. Penguin Publishing Group. February 22, 2002. ISBN 978-0142000557.
- 2005 — The Sociopath Next Door: The Ruthless Versus the Rest of Us. Broadway Books. 2005. ISBN 978-0767915823.
- 2007 — The Paranoia Switch: How Terror Rewires Our Brains and Reshapes Our Behavior - and How We Can Reclaim Our Courage. Farrar, Straus and Giroux. 2007. ISBN 978-0374229993.
- 2020 — Outsmarting the Sociopath Next Door: How to Protect Yourself Against a Ruthless Manipulator. Harmony Books. 21 April 2020. ISBN 0307589072.

== See also ==
- Limbic system
