= Henrietta Hill =

British High Court Judge

The Honourable Mrs Justice Hill DBE, KC
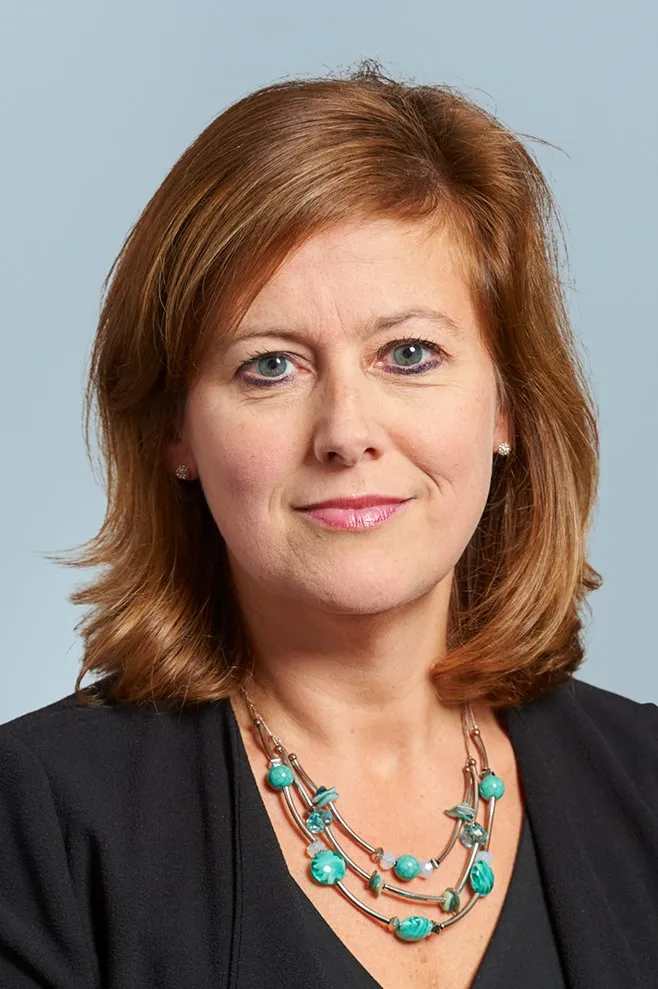

Justice of the High Court
- Incumbent
- Assumed office 11 January 2022
- Appointed by: Elizabeth II

Personal details
- Born: 30 September 1973 (age 53) Leeds, United Kingdom
- Spouse: Richard Kenyon (m. 2012)
- Children: 2 boys
- Education: Cambridge University
- Profession: Judge

Dame Eleanor Mary Henrietta Hill DBE, KC (born 30 September 1973) is a British High Court Judge.

== Early life and education ==
Hill was born on 30 September 1973 in Leeds, Yorkshire, where she studied at Gateways School. She studied law at Emmanuel College, Cambridge.

She married Richard Kenyon in 2012, with whom she has 2 children.

== Career ==
Hill was called to the Bar in October 1997 at Inner Temple, specialising in public inquiries, inquests and discrimination law. Before becoming a judge, she was a member of Doughty Street Chambers.

Hill has been involved in many high-profile inquiries. These include representing 22 families concerning the Hillsborough disaster and acting for the family of Dawn Sturgess in the inquest concerning poisoning of Sergei and Yulia Skripal.

Hill was appointed as an Assistant Coroner in 2013. She is now an Honorary/Retired member of the Coroners' Society of England and Wales.

She was appointed Queen's Counsel in 2015 by Queen Elizabeth II. From 2016 to 2021, Hill was Deputy Counsel to the Independent Inquiry into Child Sexual Abuse. In 2022, she was appointed a High Court Judge. She received the customary damehood in 2023.
