= Andy McNab's Tour of Duty =

British documentary

- Andy McNab's Tour of Duty opening title
- Starring: Andy McNab
- Narrated by: Andy McNab
- Country of origin: United Kingdom
- Original language: English
- No. of series: 1
- No. of episodes: 6

Production
- Executive producers: Taylor Downing, David Edgar
- Running time: 1 hour (with adverts)

Original release
- Network: ITV4
- Release: 10 June – 15 July 2008

Andy McNab's Tour of Duty is a British documentary television series about the War in Afghanistan and the Iraq War.

First broadcast from 10 June to 15 July 2008 on ITV4, the show is presented by ex-SAS soldier Andy McNab, and is cast as an insight into the life of the Allied soldiers in these conflicts, setting aside the already well documented politics of the conflicts and giving accounts in the soldier's own personal frames of reference.

The series combines first hand accounts and amateur film footage shot by the soldiers on the ground, with official archive footage from the Ministry of Defence, and reconstructions.

The series was first commissioned by ITV from Flashback Productions as a 6-part series of 1-hour episodes, to be broadcast exclusively as original programming for the digital channel ITV4 in a move to increase spending on the channel's output in a bid to increase the channel's audience share, and target the channel toward a demographic of 25- to 44-year-old men.

== Season 1 ==
Each of five episodes covers a basic military topic. The majority of each 1 hour episode is made up of the narration and reconstruction of a particular engagement. In conjunction, a second unrelated engagement is also narrated and reconstructed in parallel in a short slot. Both reconstructions are interspersed with the accounts of those involved and real footage. Also included are so-called 'McNab briefings', where McNab describes particular weapons and tactics. Background information about the units is also given.

=== Episode 1 – Under Siege ===
- Major engagement – Members of the Princess of Wales's Royal Regiment in central Al-Amarah, Iraq, come under sustained siege and mortar fire in their base, a former governor's residence, overlooking a bend in the Tigris. The base is defended with the help of the snipers in the unit.
- Minor engagement – A US Marine sniper gives covering fire to an ambushed patrol in Iraq, from a position atop a gasometer.
- Briefing – British Army sniper rifle, sniping, force protection

=== Episode 2 – Face to Face ===
- Major engagement – In Basra, a 9-man 2 vehicle patrol by 1 RHA is trapped in a house by Iraqi insurgents, and resists attack in close quarters. They are eventually extracted by Warrior tracked armoured vehicles of the Princess of Wales's Royal Regiment with no casualties, although one of the extraction force is killed.
- Minor engagement – US Army Staff Sergeant David Bellavia of the 2nd Infantry Regiment fights hand to hand with an insurgent in a building in Falluja.
- Briefing – SA80 assault rifle, urban fighting, snap shooting

=== Episode 3 – Ambush ===
- Major engagement – A foot patrol of 3 PARA, in the first few weeks of their deployment in Operation Herrick in Afghanistan, are ambushed upon leaving the village of Zumbelay after a routine hearts and minds visit. They are accompanied on the patrol by two embedded journalists from The Times, and a 4 vehicle fire support group.
- Minor engagement – A US Marine diverts fire from wounded colleagues after an ambush by engaging a house with an RPG in Iraq
- Briefing – Heavy calibre machine gun. Ambush tactics.

=== Episode 4 – Man Down ===
- Major engagement – A platoon from 2 Mercian on patrol come under fire in a Taliban ambush. Casualties and fatalities occur, one of whom is a member of the rescue party
- Minor engagement – A US Marine attempts to save a wounded Marine, while being wounded himself.
- Briefing – L7 GPMG

=== Episode 5 – Hidden Enemy ===
- Major engagement –
- Minor engagement – An EOD US Marine confronts an exploding IED
- Briefing – Javelin anti-tank missile system. Improvised Explosive Device.

=== Episode 6 – Courage Under Fire ===
- Major engagement – Royal Engineers forces are under continuous fire from Taliban while constructing fortified defensive positions in Gereshk, Afghanistan; an Engineer drives a digger into a raging fire-fight to construct a bridge; a British Pathfinder risks his life to save a Danish Recon soldier, outnumbered ten-to-one by attacking Taliban in the Battle for Musa Quala.
- Minor engagement – Outnumbered by Iraqi Republican Guards, a US sapper with the 3rd Infantry Division is heroically killed while defending a compound with fellow sappers.
- Briefing – 40mm Grenade Machinegun
