= Kevin Dutton =

British psychologist and writer

Kevin Dutton (born 1967) is a British psychologist and writer, specialising in the study of psychopathy.

== Work ==
He is a postdoctoral researcher at the Department of Experimental Psychology, University of Oxford, and a member of the Oxford Centre for Emotions and Affective Neuroscience (OCEAN) research group, and says "I divide my time between lab-based research and popular writing." Before this post he was a research fellow at the Faraday Institute, St Edmund's College, University of Cambridge, and Visiting Professor for the Public Engagement with Psychological Science at the University of Essex. He gained his Ph.D. from the University of Essex in 2000 with the thesis title Minorities as symbols of uniqueness : a break from the norm.

He heads a research group on "The Role of Personality Traits and Emotion Regulation Skills in Various Occupational Domains.", and his research looks at the role of various "personality traits and emotion regulation skills" in different occupations such as "politics, investment banking, surgery, and the military", and whether action can be taken to enhance these characteristics "to improve job performance and decision making in these occupations."

He has written several popular books on psychopathy, and a review stated that "his analysis tends to reinforce the idea that the chemistry of megalomania which characterises the psychopathic criminal mind is a close cousin to the set of traits often best rewarded by capitalism". He has said that he wrote The Wisdom of Psychopaths "as an attempt to figure out his dad"; his father worked on a market stall and was "ruthless, fearless and also extremely charming".

In his 2011 Great British Psychopath Survey he concluded that the ten professions that have the highest proportion of psychopaths are:

1. CEOs
2. Lawyers
3. Media people (TV and radio)
4. Sales people
5. Surgeons
6. Journalists
7. Police officers
8. Clergy
9. Chefs
10. Civil servants

All of these careers require a strong degree of professional detachment. In the same year he featured in Channel 4's "Psychopath Night", and launched a survey to which 700,000 viewers responded. Among the conclusions: "those with the least psychopathic traits preferred cats or kittens to many other pets while the most psychopathic individuals preferred pet fish."

In October 2014 he appeared on BBC Radio 4's The Museum of Curiosity. His hypothetical donation to this fictional museum was "a smile".

Beginning in 2021, he co-hosted the podcast Psycho Schizo Espresso with Iron Maiden vocalist Bruce Dickinson.

== Selected publications ==
- Black and White Thinking: The burden of a binary brain in a complex world (2020, Random House, ISBN 9781473558311)
- Kevin Dutton (1 September 2016). "Would You Vote for a Psychopath? Research shows that some of the component traits of psychopathy help leaders succeed". scientificamerican.com. Scientific American.
- The Good Psychopath's Guide to Success by Kevin Dutton and Andy McNab, with cartoons by Rob Murray (2014, Bantam Press, ISBN 9780593073995)
- The Wisdom of Psychopaths: What Saints, Spies, and Serial Killers Can Teach Us about Success (2012, Heinemann, ISBN 9780434020676)
- Flipnosis: The Art of Split-Second Persuasion (2008, Heinemann, ISBN 9780434016914)

== See also ==
- Psychopathy in the workplace
