= Sarah Morgan (judge) =

British High Court Judge

The Honourable Mrs Justice Morgan DBE
- Royal coat of arms of the United Kingdom

Justice of the High Court
- Incumbent
- Assumed office 11 January 2022
- Appointed by: Elizabeth II

Personal details
- Born: Sarah Mary Morgan
- Education: Brunel University

Dame Sarah Mary Morgan, DBE (born 17 September 1964) is a British barrister and High Court Judge.

Morgan was born in Wales, the daughter of a teacher and a civil engineer. She spent some of her early childhood living in the Caribbean before her family returned to the UK and settled in the Midlands, where she attended state schools. Morgan studied law at Brunel University, graduating in 1987.

She was called to the Bar at Gray's Inn in 1988. Morgan was appointed a Recorder sitting in the criminal and family courts on the South Eastern circuit in 2009 and was appointed a Queen's Counsel in 2011. In 2019, she was appointed as a deputy High Court Judge.

On 11 January 2022, Morgan was appointed a judge of the Family Division of the High Court following several retirements and elevations to the Court of Appeal. She received the customary damehood in 2023.

Prior to being appointed to the judiciary, Morgan practised from 1GC Family Law in London where she specialised in Family Law, particularly relating to children.
