= D. Brenton Simons =

D. Brenton Simons OBE
- Born: New Haven, Connecticut
- Education: Boston University
- Writing career
- Genre: Non-fiction
- Subjects: History of pre-Federal Boston and UK/USA heritage
- Notable works: Witches, Rakes, and Rogues
- Notable awards: Award of Merit from the American Association for State and Local History

David Brenton Simons OBE is president and CEO of the New England Historic Genealogical Society (AmericanAncestors.org), a nonfiction history author, and an American genealogist.

He served as Vice Chair of the Plymouth 400th Anniversary State Commission by appointment of Massachusetts Governor Charlie Baker. In this role, he has led commemorative activities in the United States, United Kingdom, and The Netherlands, and has established the world's largest online database of Mayflower descendants. He was also appointed by Governor Baker in 2021 as a member of the Special Commission on the Seal and Motto of the Commonwealth of Massachusetts.

He is President of the American Friends of St. George's Chapel, Windsor Castle, and Descendants of The Knights of the Garter, a nonprofit organization supporting St. George's Chapel, a royal peculiar under the jurisdiction of King Charles III, affiliate of The Society of the Friends of St George's and Descendants of the Knights of the Garter. He is also President of the 36th International Congress of Genealogical and Heraldic Sciences, a biennial conference begun in Barcelona in 1929, which will be held in for the first time in the United States in 2024, in Boston.

== Career ==
Originally from New Haven, Connecticut, and a graduate of Boston University's College of Communication (1988) and School of Education (1994), Simons joined the staff of the New England Historic Genealogical Society in 1993 and was appointed its president and CEO in 2005. During his tenure, membership in the organization has grown dramatically to over 300,000 individuals in 139 countries. The Society now conducts numerous research projects and activities in the United States and the United Kingdom, and, under Simons, serves as the anchor location of the PBS television series Finding Your Roots with Henry Louis Gates, Jr. Simons has regularly announced the organization's research on the ancestry of presidents, presidential candidates and other public figures.

Simons initiated the Lifetime Achievement Award program at the New England Historic Genealogical Society which has attracted numerous high-profile individuals to the organization as members and honorees. Recipients have included the prize-winning authors David McCullough and Stacy Schiff; actress Angela Lansbury; filmmaker Ken Burns; historian Doris Kearns Goodwin; and former UK Prime Minister Sir John Major;. On July 28, 2022, Julian Fellowes accepted the Award in Newport RI. Honorary trustees of the Society now include Henry Louis Gates Jr. and Stacy Schiff. In 2019, Simons announced a $1.25 million grant for youth education programs to the New England Historic Genealogical Society from bestselling authors Tabitha King and Stephen King.

== Published works ==
The Art of Family: Genealogical Artifacts in New England, co-edited with Peter Benes, and essays by Simons, Abbott Lowell Cummings, John Putnam Demos, Wendell Garrett, and Laurel Thatcher Ulrich. Boston: Northeastern University Press, 2002.

Witches, Rakes, and Rogues: True Stories of Scam, Scandal, Murder and Mayhem, in Boston, 1630-1775. Carlisle, MA: Applewood Books: 2005.

Boston Beheld: Antique Town and Country Views Hanover, NH and London: University Press of New England: 2008.

== Awards and honors ==
In 2021, Simons received the first John Adams Medal for Outstanding Merit in the Study of History and Lifetime Achievement in Institutional Leadership. Also in 2021, he was awarded The History Medal from the National Society of the Daughters of the American Revolution for his work in “significantly advancing the understanding of America’s past on a national level.” He previously received the Spirit of 1812 Award in 2016. In 2006, the American Association for State and Local History, conferred its Award of Merit on Simons for his book Witches, Rakes and Rogues: True Stories of Scam, Scandal, Murder and Mayhem, in Boston, 1630-1775.

- 2021 The Bradford Award, Pilgrim Hall Museum

Simons was granted a coat of arms from the College of Arms, London, in April 2019. He was appointed a member of the Most Venerable Order of Saint John by Elizabeth II in April 2020.

In 2023, Simons was appointed an Honorary Officer of the Order of the British Empire for services to Anglo-American history.

In 2024 Simons received the HS Genealogy/History Achievement Award from the American Library Association.

== Family ==
Simons is the son of the late paleontologist Elwyn L. Simons and his first wife, Mary Hoyt Fitch. He is the grandson of philosopher Frederic Brenton Fitch, inventor of Fitch-style calculus, and the great-great-grandson of New York City politician and financier Ashbel Parmelee Fitch.

Coat of arms of D. Brenton Simons
Crest Upon a Helm with a Wreath Or and Sable A three-masted square-rigged Ship Vert sails set flags flying Argent charged on the hull with an Escallop Or between two May Flowers proper. Escutcheon Sable a heraldic Dolphin naiant on a Chief engrailed Or three Escallops Vert. Motto Je Vive En Esperance
