= Royal Oak Foundation =

Emblem of the foundation

The Royal Oak Foundation is an alliance of American citizens supporting the mission of the National Trust of England, Wales and Northern Ireland, which is Britain's largest heritage organisation. The foundation is headquartered in New York City.

Established in 1973, the Royal Oak Foundation is a United States tax-exempt non-profit 501(c)(3) organisation. The foundation supports the preservation and conservation of places of natural beauty, historic properties, monuments and gardens in Britain.

In the United States, the foundation sponsors the Drue Heinz Lecture Series, which presents lectures to the public in major U.S. cities on the subjects of architecture, social history, landscape design, interior decoration and decorative arts. The foundation also supports the Damaris Horan Prize Fellowship in Landscape History, sponsoring promising scholars and professionals to work on projects with the National Trust.

Throughout its history, the Royal Oak Foundation has raised millions of dollars to support the work of the National Trust. Its Centenary Campaign (begun in 1996) raised in excess of $2,400,000 to support work on the country house libraries in the National Trust's care, including the endowment of a permanent, full-time librarian.

Membership is open to the general public, and it includes free admission to historic properties operated by the National Trust in the United Kingdom.
