= Andy McNab =

English army sergeant and author (born 1959)

Andy McNab CBE DCM MM
- Born: Steven Billy Mitchell; 28 December 1959 (age 66)
- Military career
- Allegiance: United Kingdom
- Branch: British Army
- Service years: 1976–1993
- Rank: Sergeant
- Service number: 24428654
- Units: Royal Green Jackets (1976–84); Special Air Service (1984–93); 14 Intelligence Company (secondment)
- Commands: Bravo Two Zero
- Conflicts: The Troubles; Gulf War
- Awards: Commander of the Order of the British Empire; Distinguished Conduct Medal; Military Medal
- Other work: Author

Steven Billy Mitchell CBE, DCM, MM (born 28 December 1959), usually known by the pseudonym and pen-name of Andy McNab, is a British novelist and former Special Air Service soldier.

He came into public prominence in 1993 when he published a book entitled Bravo Two Zero containing an account of a military mission which he led with the Special Air Service (SAS) during the Gulf War, for which he was awarded the Distinguished Conduct Medal. He had previously been awarded the Military Medal in 1979 for gallantry in action whilst serving with the Royal Green Jackets in Northern Ireland.

He has published a number of other novels and two autobiographies in addition to Bravo Two Zero. He has also published a book on psychopathy entitled The Good Psychopath's Guide to Success, claiming that he exhibits many psychopathic traits.

== Early life ==
McNab was born on 28 December 1959. He did not do well in school, and eventually attended nine schools in seven years. After dropping out of school McNab worked at various odd jobs, usually for friends and relatives, and was involved in petty criminality, finally being arrested for burglary in 1976. Partly inspired by his brother's time in the army, he wanted to join the British Army. He failed the entry test for training as an army pilot, but enlisted with the Royal Green Jackets at the age of sixteen after being released from juvenile detention.

When McNab joined the army he was found to have the reading age of an eleven-year-old. Shortly before his seventeenth birthday he read his first book, entitled Janet and John. Speaking in 2019, McNab recalled how "I can vividly remember the sense of pride and achievement I felt. It was meant for primary school children but I didn’t care ... From then on I read anything and everything I could get my hands on."

== Military career ==
He was posted to Kent for his basic training, and boxed for his regimental team. After basic training, he was posted to the Rifle Depot in Winchester. In 1977 he spent time in Gibraltar as part of his first operational posting, while with 2nd Battalion, Royal Green Jackets.

From December 1977 to June 1978, he was posted to South Armagh, Northern Ireland, as part of the British Army's Operation Banner. In 1978 and 1979, he returned to Armagh as a newly promoted Lance Corporal, and claimed to have killed for the first time during a firefight with the Provisional Irish Republican Army. McNab wrote of the incident: "I remember vividly the first time I had to kill someone to stay alive. I was a 19-year-old soldier in Keady, South Armagh, and my patrol stumbled across six IRA soldiers, preparing for an ambush. When the shooting started, they were just 20 metres away from my patrol. I was scared, very scared." He was awarded the Military Medal for this incident. However, security sources later reported that the person McNab shot was only wounded and died as a result of injuries from a separate shootout later that day.

In 1982, after six years' service with the Royal Green Jackets (RGJ), and having been promoted to the rank of sergeant, he applied for transfer into the Special Air Service Regiment, which was approved by the RGJ. After failing his first attempt at SAS selection, he passed in 1984, and was attached to the SAS, with which he remained for the rest of his career in the British Army. During his 10 years with "Air Troop", B Squadron, 22 SAS Regiment, he served with Al Slater, Frank Collins and Charles "Nish" Bruce. Writing in The Daily Telegraph in November 2008, McNab describes Bruce as "one of my heroes."

McNab worked on both covert and overt operations including counter terrorism and drug operations in the Middle East and Far East, South and Central America and Northern Ireland. McNab trained as a specialist in counter terrorism, prime target elimination, demolitions, weapons, tactics, covert surveillance roles and information gathering in hostile environments, and VIP protection. He worked on cooperative operations with police forces, prison services, anti-drug forces and Western-backed guerrilla movements as well as on conventional special operations. In Northern Ireland, he spent two years working as an undercover operator with 14 Intelligence Company, going on to become an instructor.

During the Gulf War, McNab commanded an eight-man SAS patrol, designated Bravo Two Zero, that was given the task of destroying underground communication links between Baghdad and north-west Iraq and with tracking Scud missile movements in the region. The patrol was dropped into Iraq on 22 January 1991, but was soon compromised, following which it attempted an escape on foot towards Syria, the closest coalition country.

Three of the eight were killed, and four captured (including McNab) after three days on the run; one member, Chris Ryan, escaped. The captured men were held for six weeks before being released on 5 March. By that time, McNab was suffering from nerve damage to both hands, a dislocated shoulder, kidney and liver damage, and hepatitis B. After six months of medical treatment he was back on active service.

Awarded both the Distinguished Conduct Medal and Military Medal during his military career, McNab claims to have been the British Army's most highly decorated serving soldier when he left the SAS in February 1993.

== Post-military career ==
McNab assumed his pseudonym while writing Bravo Two Zero. When he appeared on television to promote his books or to act as a special services expert, his face was shadowed to prevent identification. According to the book The Big Breach, by Richard Tomlinson, a renegade MI6 spy, McNab was part of a special training team after the Iraq War, training MI6 recruits in sabotage and guerrilla warfare techniques.

Due to the extremely sensitive nature of his work while serving with the SAS, McNab is bound by contract to submit his writings to the Ministry of Defence for review.

After leaving the Army, McNab developed and maintained a specialist training course for news crews, journalists and members of non-governmental organisations working in hostile environments. He spent time in Hollywood as a technical weapons adviser and trainer on Michael Mann's film Heat. He was also the technical adviser on the 2005 crime film Dirty.

In February 2007, McNab returned to Iraq for seven days as The Sun newspaper's security adviser with 2nd Battalion, The Rifles.

McNab has written about his experiences in the SAS in three best-selling books, Bravo Two Zero (1993), Immediate Action (1995), and Seven Troop (2008). Bravo Two Zero sold over 1.7 million copies, with Immediate Action selling 1.4 million in the UK. It has been published in 17 countries and translated into 16 languages. The CD spoken word version of Bravo Two Zero, narrated by McNab, sold over 60,000 copies and earned a silver disc. A BBC film of Bravo Two Zero, starring Sean Bean, was shown on prime time BBC One television in 1999 and released on DVD in 2000. Immediate Action, McNab's autobiography, spent 18 weeks at the top of the best-seller lists following the lifting of an ex-parte injunction granted to the Ministry of Defence in September 1995.

The veracity of McNab's first book, Bravo Two Zero, has been questioned by Michael Asher, an explorer, Arabist and former SAS reservist, who visited Iraq with a Channel 4 film crew, and interviewed many eyewitnesses. Asher concluded that much of what McNab wrote was a fabrication, and that there was no evidence that the Bravo Two Zero patrol accounted for a single enemy casualty. Moreover, McNab's account and that of his comrade Chris Ryan are contradictory on many points. This has been corroborated by Peter Ratcliffe, who was regimental sergeant major of 22 SAS Regiment during the Gulf War, who stated that, in a debriefing to the entire Regiment, recorded on video, none of the patrol members mentioned contacts with large numbers of enemies or any of the other extraordinary incidents included in the books. Asher's conclusion was that the book's claim to be "the true story of an SAS patrol in action" was a fraud.

McNab now lives in New York City with his fifth wife. He is a director of military service recruitment, mentoring and Foundation organisation, ForceSelect.

In August 2014, McNab was one of 200 public figures who were signatories to a letter to The Guardian expressing their hope that Scotland would vote to remain part of the United Kingdom in September's referendum on that issue.

In the 2017 Birthday Honours, McNab was appointed Commander of the Order of the British Empire (CBE) for services to literacy and charity. The award recognised his charity work with The Reading Agency promoting literacy, particularly in young adults and prisoners. The award was gazetted under the name "Andrew McNab".

== Fiction writing ==
McNab is the author of a number of action thrillers written with the help of a ghostwriter.

The Nick Stone Missions are a successful series based on an ex-SAS soldier working on deniable operations for British intelligence. The series draws extensively on McNab's experiences and knowledge of Special Forces soldiering. The Boy Soldier Series was written with the co-operation of Robert Rigby and follows a boy named Danny Watts and his grandfather Fergus, apparently a rogue ex-SAS soldier.

McNab has also written books for Quick Reads, a charity that supports World Book Day. BBC raw words offers exclusive audio versions of the latest Quick Reads by Andy McNab, Last Night Another Soldier (2010), read by Rupert Degas. Other fiction books include Audio Stories, Men at War series, Battlefield 3, Tom Buckingham series, and two young adult series: Dropzone Stories and The New Recruit series.

McNab worked with DICE serving as the game's consultant on military tactics for Battlefield 3. He penned a tie-in novel called Battlefield 3: The Russian, which follows the story of a Spetsnaz GRU commando Dmitri "Dima" Mayakovsky and his involvement against the PLR (People's Liberation & Resistance), an Iranian paramilitary insurgent group, as well as his connection to the antagonist. The novel was released on 25 October 2011.

=== Film work ===
After his work on the Miramax film Heat, Miramax acquired the film rights to the first four of McNab's novels, and as of 2011 Echelon was in production, based on the book Firewall (2000). McNab is to co-produce and co-write the script and also act as technical adviser. In 2014, Luke Evans was cast as Tom Buckingham in Red Notice with Nick Love as director. McNab is to consult as technical adviser and have a role in production as well. This did not end up happening.

== Other work ==
McNab took part in E4's Big Brother: Celebrity Hijack on 13 January 2008.

The Mobcast e-book platform he co-founded with Tony Lynch was sold to Tesco for £4.5 million; McNab's share was £1 million.

== Books ==
=== Non-fiction ===
- Bravo Two Zero (1993)
- Immediate Action (1995)
- Seven Troop (2008)
- Spoken From The Front (2009)
- Spoken From The Front 2 (2011)
- The Good Psychopath's Guide to Success (2014 – co-writer Dr. Kevin Dutton)
- Sorted!: The Good Psychopath's Guide to Bossing Your Life (The Good Psychopath 2) (2015)
- The Hunt (2022)
- The Rescue (2023)

=== Fiction ===
Nick Stone Missions

1. Remote Control (17 February 1998)
2. Crisis Four (22 August 2000)
3. Firewall (5 October 2000)
4. Last Light (1 October 2001)
5. Liberation Day (1 October 2002)
6. Dark Winter (3 November 2003)
7. Deep Black (1 November 2004)
8. Aggressor (1 November 2005)
9. Recoil (6 November 2006)
10. Crossfire (12 November 2007)
11. Brute Force (3 November 2008)
12. Exit Wound (5 November 2009)
13. Zero Hour (25 November 2010)
14. Dead Centre (15 September 2011)
15. Silencer (24 October 2013)
16. For Valour (23 October 2014)
17. Detonator (22 October 2015)
18. Cold Blood (20 October 2016)
19. Line Of Fire (20 October 2017)
20. Down to the Wire (November 2022)

Boy Soldier Series (written with Robert Rigby)

1. Boy Soldier (US title Traitor, 5 May 2005)
2. Payback (6 October 2005)
3. Avenger (4 May 2006)
4. Meltdown (3 May 2007)

Quick Reads project

1. The Grey Man (8 May 2006)
2. Last Night Another Soldier (4 May 2010)
3. Today Everything Changes (31 January 2013)
4. On The Rock (4 February 2016)

Audio stories

1. Iraq Ambush (May 2007)
2. Royal Kidnap (June 2007)
3. Roadside Bomb (September 2007)
4. Sniper (TBA ?)

Dropzone Series (Young Adult)

1. Dropzone Bk. 1 (February 2010)
2. Dropzone Bk. 2 – Terminal Velocity (March 2011)

Men at War Series (written with Kym Jordan)

1. War Torn (13 May 2010)
2. Battle Lines (19 July 2012)

Battlefield 3

1. Battlefield 3: The Russian (October 2011)

Tom Buckingham Series

1. Red Notice (25 October 2012)
2. Fortress (22 May 2014)
3. State Of Emergency (21 May 2015)

Nathan Pike Series

1. Shadow State (5 January 2023)

The New Recruit – Liam Scott series (Young Adult)

1. The New Recruit (20 December 2012)
2. The New Patrol (30 January 2014)
3. The New Enemy (15 January 2015)

Street Soldier – Sean Harker (Young Adult)

1. Street Soldier (11 August 2016)
2. Silent Weapon (10 August 2017)

== Television ==
- Andy McNab's Tour of Duty
