= Mercenaries in popular culture =

Representation of mercenaries in media

Like piracy, the mercenary ethos resonates with idealized adventure, mystery, and danger, and appears frequently in popular culture. Many are called adventurers, filibusters, soldiers of fortune, gunslingers, gunrunners, ronin, and knights errant.

== Books ==
- In "The Legend of Sleepy Hollow", from Washington Irving's Knickerbocker Tales, the Headless Horseman is said to be the ghost of a Hessian mercenary who was decapitated by a cannonball during the American Revolution.
- Walter Scott's "A Legend of Montrose", set in Scotland during the Civil War of the 1640s includes the character Dugald Dalgetty, an experienced mercenary who does not fight out of political or religious conviction, but purely for the love of carnage. However, he is very professional, and remains loyal to an employer to the end of his contract. He gained his experience fighting for various armies during the Thirty Years' War, then still raging in Germany.
- Walter Scott's "Ivanhoe" features a band of mercenaries referred to as the Free Companions, led by Maurice de Bracy. They are initially supportive of an attempted usurpation of the rule of England by Prince John.
- During the 1880s, Colonel Thomas Hoyer Monstery wrote or co-wrote a series of dime novel adventure stories said to have been inspired by his own activities as a mercenary in Central America and South America.
- Richard Harding Davis wrote the 1897 novel Soldier of Fortune.
- Davis later wrote a non-fiction Real Soldiers of Fortune in 1906. The account featured true stories of Major-General Henry McIver, Baron James Harden-Hickey, Winston Spencer Churchill, Captain Philo Norton McGiffin, General William Walker, and Major Frederick Russell Burnham, chief of scouts.
- The novel The Dogs of War by Frederick Forsyth and the 1981 film of the same name, which go into some detail about an actual if fictionalized mercenary operation in Africa in the 1960s.
- The novel The Wild Geese (originally titled The Thin White Line) by Daniel Carney and the 1978 film of the same name. The plot is that a global British financial syndicate seeks to rescue the deposed leader of a central African nation. It hires a band of mercenaries to do the job.
- Both the titles Dogs of War and The Wild Geese are derived from other sources. "Cry Havoc, and let slip the dogs of war" is from Act III, scene 1 of Julius Caesar by Shakespeare. After the signing of the Treaty of Limerick (1691) the soldiers of the Irish Army who left Ireland for France took part in what is known as the Flight of the Wild Geese. Subsequently, many made a living from working as mercenaries for continental armies, the most famous of whom was Patrick Sarsfield, who, having fallen mortally wounded on a foreign field, said "If this was only for Ireland".
- An episode in With Fire and Sword (Ogniem i mieczem), an 1884 historical novel by the Polish author Henryk Sienkiewicz, set in the 17th century Khmelnytsky uprising, depicts a band of German mercenaries with high professional ethics, who prefer to fight to the death against impossible odds rather than betray their contract to the King of Poland.
- At the end of Micah Clarke, a historical novel by Conan Doyle, the protagonists – hunted in England for their part in the failed Monmouth Rebellion of 1685 – set out to be mercenaries in Europe, until conditions in their homeland change. The book's young protagonist is told: "You are now one of the old and honourable guild of soldiers of fortune. While the Turk is still snarling at the gates of Vienna there will ever be work for strong arms and brave hearts. You will find that among these wandering, fighting men, drawn from all climes and nations, the name of Englishman stands high".
- The 1967 novel Dirty Story by Eric Ambler depicts the misadventures of the half-caste petty criminal Arthur Abdel Simpson who takes up a career as a mercenary for a cynical mining company in Central Africa. Simpson is a misfit unsuited for the role of mercenary, yet he manages to outwit his far tougher professional colleagues and keeps the reader's sympathy as an engaging rogue.
- Tenth Man Down by Chris Ryan, a military novel regarding modern-day British training advisers in a chaotic post-colonial African nation (Known as "Kamanga", possibly after the unrecognized state in Congo), features mercenary characters ranging from minor antagonists to unlikely allies. Many are revealed to be Afrikaans-speaking white South Africans who formerly served with the SADF. The mercenaries in this storyline are initially working for anti-government rebels, paid for their services in diamonds pilfered from a local mine. However, this alliance begins to falter after subsequent clashes with Kamangan Special Forces robs the employers of their payment source. Several of the Afrikaners desert, while two others, including a sniper, are captured and cannibalized by the government troops. The only American mercenary soldier in the unit, a former US Navy SEAL, eventually helps the protagonist Geordie Sharp escape from a rebel camp.

== Science fiction and fantasy ==
Mercenaries have featured in a number of science-fiction novels. Author Jerry Pournelle has written several books about science-fiction mercenaries known as Falkenberg's Legion. Also, author David Drake has written a number of books about the fictional hovercraft armored regiment Hammer's Slammers. Both series of books are brutal in their portrayal of complex low-intensity warfare despite technological advances. Gordon R. Dickson's Dorsai!, part of his Childe Cycle, includes the planet Dorsai with a society structured like that of Switzerland. Like the old style Swiss mercenaries who hired themselves out to the Italian states, Dorsai hire themselves out to other planets. A series by Mercedes Lackey concerning mercenaries is the Vows and Honor Trilogy (The Oathbound, Oathbreakers, Oathblood). Barry Sadler formerly of the U.S. Army Special Forces and singer of "The Ballad of the Green Berets" wrote a series called Casca series about Casca Rufio Longinius, a soldier in the Roman legions who is cursed by Christ on Golgotha for driving a spear into him.

There have been a number of books based on the fictional universe developed for the board game BattleTech and in which mercenaries feature: Robert Thurston, The Legend of the Jade Phoenix; Loren L. Coleman, Patriots and Tyrants and Storms of Fate. The mercenary industry in the BattleTech universe is also depicted as a booming profession, with mercenaries being accredited for work through an interstellar body called the Mercenary Review and Bonding Commission.

Also George R. R. Martin's A Song of Ice and Fire an epic fantasy series, feature mercenary characters known as "sellswords", who are generally seen as greedy, unscrupulous and cowardly by the society. Similarly, Glen Cook's The Black Company series focuses on the adventures of an elite mercenary unit.

Mercenaries are also featured heavily in Joe Abercrombie's The First Law series

The South African mercenary, Christian Rindert is a principal character in Hugh Paxton's 2006 novel Homunculus published by Macmillan in paperback (March 2007, ISBN 978-0-230-00736-9) which features mercenary operations and the testing of horrific new bio-weapons during the civil war in Sierra Leone.

In the Ashes series by William W. Johnstone, the main character of Ben Raines is mentioned as having worked as a mercenary-for-hire in several African armed conflicts after leaving the U.S. military (having served during the Vietnam War). During his service time, he was a member of the 'Hell-Hounds', a military unit that is said to be the closest version to a mercenary group that the U.S. has ever fielded in battle.

Mercenaries or "Mercs" are a recurring characters in "The Chronicles of Riddick" Universe. In this setting, Mercs are often found filling the roles of Bounty Hunters who take out contracts to capture the universe's most dangerous criminals and turn them over to brutal Triple Max Prisons. These Mercs often work alone or in small groups, however they are known to sign on to larger crews depending on their contract. Mercs are contracted through an umbrella organisation known as "The Guild" which legalizes and loosely monitors their activities, however, many Mercs are partial to the practices of kidnapping for profit and stealing prisoners, often using extreme violence. There are vary few limits to which these Mercs will go to accomplish a mission, such as posing as police officers and infiltrating occupied planets just to capture one rogue convict. The recent Xbox 360 game The Chronicles of Riddick: Assault on Dark Athena features a large group of "Rogue Mercs" arguably space pirates, who raid passing vessels and transform the occupants into mindless "Ghost Drones" which become a commodity to sell to the warring factions of the galaxy. Bounty Hunter Mercs are sometimes known as "Fake Badges".

== Magazines and comics ==
A magazine ostensibly written for mercenary soldiers is Soldier of Fortune (SOF). The popularity of SOF led to several similar magazines with titles such as Survive, Gung Ho!, New Breed, Eagle, Combat Illustrated, Special Weapons and Tactics, Combat and Survival (still published), and Combat Ready that have mostly ceased publication.

Captain Easy Soldier of Fortune was an American comic from the 1930s to the 1980s.

The manga Hellsing features a band of mercenaries known as The Wild Geese, led by Pip Bernadotte. It is unclear whether the mercenaries are intended to be representing the same group as in the Daniel Carney novel, though this is possible. It is also likely that the group takes its name from The Wild Geese, the Irish who left Ireland following the Treaty of Limerick, since it was the Wild Geese serving France who finally broke the back of the English army at the Battle of Fontenoy in 1745.

The manga Dragon Ball features the Ginyu Force, elite mercenaries hired by Freeza.

The manga Berserk prominently features a group of mercenaries, the Band of the Hawk. The main character, Guts, is also raised by mercenaries.

The manga Inuyasha features The Band of Seven, a band of seven mercenaries that loved to kill and were so strong that warlords feared their strength even as allies, before they were hunted down and beheaded. They were revived ten years later as spectres guarding the main antagonist Naraku in exchange for eternal life from Shikon Jewel shards.

Full Metal Panic! and its various sequels focus largely on a mercenary organization known as Mithril.

The manga and anime series Black Lagoon focuses on a group of mercenaries known as The Lagoon Company and pirates in present-day Southeast Asia.

The Marvel Universe features many mercenary characters as heroes or villains, most notably Deadpool. Others include Moon Knight, Taskmaster, Agent X, Luke Cage, Silver Sable, and Bullseye. Mercenaries can make convenient enemies for superheroes because, plot-wise, they require no further motivation than to have been hired by another enemy.

The webcomic Schlock Mercenary follows the galactic adventures of a 31st-century mercenary company.

Slade Wilson, AKA Deathstroke is a mercenary in the DC Universe, and is an enemy of Batman and the Teen Titans. Similarly, Floyd Lawton (Deadshot) is a mercenary sniper and killer in the DC Universe, enemy of Batman, Green Arrow and other characters.

== Theatre ==
- George Bernard Shaw's 1894 play Arms and the Man, and its adaptations into the 1908 operetta The Chocolate Soldier and later films all center on the misadventures of a decidedly not soldierly Swiss mercenary in the Balkans of the later 19th century.

== Films ==
See also List of war films: Mercenaries in the third world

- Professional Soldier (1935) – Directed by Tay Garnett, with the story written by Damon Runyon features ex-US Marine Victor McLaglen hired to kidnap young prince Freddie Bartholomew but changing his mind and giving his employers notice that their services are no longer required by mowing them down with a water cooled Maxim gun fired from the hip.
- The General Died at Dawn is a 1936 film which tells the story of a mercenary who meets a beautiful girl while trying to keep arms from getting to a vicious warlord in war-torn China. The movie was written by Charles G. Booth and Clifford Odets, and directed by Lewis Milestone. It stars Gary Cooper, Madeleine Carroll and Akim Tamiroff.
- Flying Tigers (1942) and God is My Co-Pilot (1945) based on the memoirs of Robert L. Scott concern the adventures of the American Volunteer Group of pilots who flew P-40s for China against the Japanese prior to Pearl Harbor
- For Whom the Bell Tolls (1943) – Based on the novel by Ernest Hemingway, Gary Cooper is a mercenary who finds meaning to life fighting in the Spanish Civil War alongside Ingrid Bergman
- China (1943) – Alan Ladd portrays a mercenary who finds meaning to life fighting against the Japanese in China before Pearl Harbor alongside Loretta Young
- The Seven Samurai (1954) and The Magnificent Seven (1960) are both fictional accounts that deal with seven unemployed samurai (gunslingers in the Western adaptation) who agree to protect an impoverished village from 40 bandits for sub-minimal wages
- Hell and High Water (1954) – Samuel Fuller's account of a former submarine commander Richard Widmark leading a team of naval mercenaries, an atomic scientist, and his daughter on a secret mission to the Arctic Circle to stop a Red Chinese plan to atomic bomb Korea using a captured American B-29. In addition to its topicality of the Soviet H-Bomb, the film was made to showcase Cinemascope being used in the confined sets of a submarine.
- Soldier of Fortune (1955) – Based on the novel by Ernest K. Gann. Clark Gable is hired by Susan Hayward to locate and free her husband from a prison in Red China.
- The Professionals (1966) – Richard Brooks' film tells a fictional tale of 4 specialists, automatic weapons (Lee Marvin), explosives (Burt Lancaster), tracker (Woody Strode), and mule skinner (Robert Ryan) who are hired by a big businessman (Ralph Bellamy) to rescue his kidnapped wife (Claudia Cardinale) from a Mexican bandit (Jack Palance) at the beginning of the 20th century.
- Africa Addio/Africa-Blood and Guts (1966)-A documentary by the team behind Mondo Cane that filmed Africa in the early 1960s and featured mercenaires in the Congo Crisis
- Dark of the Sun/The Mercenaries (1968) – Based on the novel by Wilbur Smith originally titled Last Train From Katanga about mercenaries in the Congo Crisis and Katanga excitingly directed by Jack Cardiff starring Rod Taylor and Jim Brown, a score by Jacques Loussier, and filmed in Jamaica.
- Seduto Alla Sua Destra/Black Jesus (1968) – A fictionalised story based on Patrice Lumumba, played by Woody Strode, who is captured by mercenaries.
- El Mercenario/The Last Mercenary (1968) – A fictionalised account produced by and starring Ray Danton as a mercenary who travels from the Congo to work in Brazil.
- Sette Baschi Rossi/The Red Berets/Congo Hell (1969) – Fictionalised account of mercenaries somewhere in sub-Sahara Africa that was the directing debut of Mario Siciliano.
- The Last Grenade (1970) – Fictionalised account of mercenaries beginning in Africa then travelling to the New Territories of Hong Kong and later Red China. Only the characters are based on John Sherlock's 1964 novel The Ordeal of Major Grigsby featuring a cast of Stanley Baker, Alex Cord, Richard Attenborough, John Thaw, and Honor Blackman.
- The Last Valley (1970) – A band of unemployed mercenaries take over an isolated valley during the Thirty Years' War. The film stars Michael Caine and Omar Sharif.
- High Velocity (1976) – Fictionalised account of former Vietnam War veterans played by Ben Gazzara and Paul Winfield living and working in the Philippines.
- The Wild Geese (1978) – The film, starring Richard Burton, Roger Moore, Richard Harris and Hardy Krüger, shows the recruitment, training, and deployment of a 50-man force who rescue a moderate African leader based on Moise Tshombe in an unnamed sub-Saharan African nation. Daniel Carney's book has a screenplay by Reginald Rose, an exciting score by Roy Budd, Mike Hoare acts as technical adviser and is directed by Andrew V. McLaglen, son of Victor.
- Scorticateli Vivi/The Wild Geese Attack/Skin 'Em Alive/Duri a morire/Tough To Kill (1978) – An Italian action film which concerns a group of mercenaries in an unspecified African country who turn on each other. Many action setpieces from The Red Berets reappear in the film that was made by the same director.
- Cuba (1979) – Ex-SAS Major Sean Connery and ex-RAF pilot Denholm Elliott are hired by the Fulgencio Batista regime to put down Fidel Castro's Cuban revolution in 1959. It was directed by Richard Lester.
- The Dogs of War (1981) – Based on Frederick Forsyth's novel of a mercenary operation led by Christopher Walken that proceeds from Central America to the planning, preparation, and execution of a mercenary operation in Sub-Saharan Africa. Director John Irvin's erudite film begins with a quote from Shakespeare's Julius Caesar and ends with A.E. Housman's poem Epitaph For an Army of Mercenaries being sung over the end titles.
- Uncommon Valor (1983) – Gene Hackman recruits former soldiers to rescue POWs, including his own son, from a prison camp in Laos.
- Under Fire (1983) – A fictional account of a comedy relief mercenary in Nicaragua meeting journalist Nick Nolte
- Code Name: Wild Geese (1984) – Lewis Collins and Lee Van Cleef in a fictionalised account of mercenaries in the Far East
- Commando Leopard (1985) – Lewis Collins again is a mercenary up against rival mercenaries led by Klaus Kinski
- Flesh & Blood (1985) – The story of an insurgent mercenary band in Renaissance Italy, featuring Rutger Hauer as the band's leader.
- Men of War (1994) – John Sayles wrote a film about a group of mercenaries led by Dolph Lundgren who are sent to an unnamed Asian country on behalf of big business interests, When they empathise with the locals, their employers have to hire another mercenary group to destroy them.
- The Substitute (1996) – Tom Berenger stars as the head of a crew of mercenaries who finds himself teaching as a substitute teacher in a tough American high school by day and fighting a drug ring in his off time.
- The Lost World: Jurassic Park (1997) – The corporation InGen hires several mercenaries and hunters to capture dinosaurs on Isla Sorna.
- Ronin (1998) – Robert De Niro, Jean Reno, Natascha McElhone, Sean Bean and Stellan Skarsgård play mercenaries.
- Savior (1998) – American Regular Army officer Dennis Quaid loses his wife and child in a terrorist bomb attack in Paris that leads him to plot revenge, escape prosecution by joining the French Foreign Legion then leaving to become a mercenary in Bosnia where he rediscovers his lost humanity.
- Jurassic Park 3 (2001) – three mercenaries named Cooper, Nash, and Udesky infiltrate the island of Isla Sorna to find a missing boy named Eric Kirby only to be eaten by a Spinosaurus and a pack of Velociraptors
- Atlantis: The Lost Empire (2001) – The character Lyle T. Rourke turns out to be a mercenary operating for profit.
- Man on Fire (2004) – Denzel Washington plays a former mercenary hired as a bodyguard for a young girl in Mexico City who subsequently gets kidnapped. Christopher Walken plays his buddy and fellow mercenary who currently runs a bodyguard service in Ciudad Juarez.
- Blood Diamond (2006) – Leonardo DiCaprio plays a white Rhodesian mercenary and diamond smuggler who attempts to obtain the diamond from Djimon Hounsou's character. The film examines the use of professional mercenary soldiers in third-world conflict zones, often paid directly in namesake "blood diamonds". Especially notable is one of the movie's later scenes, which depicts a private army of ruthless South African mercenaries launching an assault on one of Sierra Leone's many dangerous conflict zones in search of rare pink diamonds.
- Outpost (2008) – Ray Stevenson plays a mercenary who is hired to protect a mysterious businessman in a war-torn eastern-bloc country with a crack team of ex-soldiers.
- Rambo (2008) – John Rambo, the main protagonist of the series, played by Sylvester Stallone joins a team of mercenaries, on a mission to save a group of volunteered missionaries, who are held captive in Burma.
- Babylon A.D. (2008) – Vin Diesel stars as a mercenary hired to protect a mysterious girl named Aurora to New York City.
- The Star Wars series, particularly the Expanded Universe, features many mercenary and bounty hunter style characters, such as Kyle Katarn and Boba Fett.
- Predators (2010) – Royce, the protagonist of the movie, is a mercenary.
- The Expendables is a film series about a group of elite mercenaries, starring Sylvester Stallone, Jason Statham, Dolph Lundgren, Jet Li, Mickey Rourke, Randy Couture, Steve Austin, Terry Crews, Bruce Willis, Arnold Schwarzenegger, Jean-Claude Van Damme, Liam Hemsworth, Chuck Norris, Antonio Banderas, Wesley Snipes, Mel Gibson, Harrison Ford, Kelsey Grammer, Ronda Rousey, Tony Jaa, and 50 Cent.
- Mercenaries (2011) – A war drama film starring Billy Zane and Kirsty Mitchell about a group of Mercenaries sent to the Balkans to rescue the US ambassador and his aid.
- The Dark Knight Rises (2012) – Bane and a younger Ra's al Ghul (prior to becoming the head of the League of Shadows) are portrayed as mercenaries. In addition, the newly resurrected League of Shadows is made up of a band of mercenaries under Bane's command.
- Justice League: The Flashpoint Paradox (2013) – The film features an alternate version of Deathstroke.

== Television ==
- The Ogrons, ape-themed aliens, served as mercenaries, tending to work for many races including the Daleks and The Master on the science fiction series Doctor Who, most famously in the episodes "Day of the Daleks" and "Frontier in Space".
- Soldier of Fortune (1955) had John Russell and Chick Chandler as two do-anything-go-anywhere adventurers; however, none of the episodes involved them being hired to wage war.
- Have Gun Will Travel (1957–1963) featured Richard Boone as "the man called Paladin" whose services were hired in each episode, answering a requesting telegram pr a newspaper article with a business card bearing the title of the show (although Paladin was hired more as a "problem solver" than as a professional soldier). Paladin's symbol was the knight piece in chess, which would explain his unexpected moves during the episode. In one episode of the later television show The Richard Boone Show, Boone played a modern version of Paladin.
- The A-Team is a 1980's series about a team of benevolent mercenaries. The violence was usually "toned down" to an almost cartoonish level to make the series acceptable for prime-time viewing (everybody shoots, no one gets hit).
- The anime television series Area 88 portrays fictional mercenaries in a country called Asran where foreign freelance pilots of all nationalities are assembled in Area 88, an isolated air force base that houses the military's only mercenary unit to fight in Asran's civil war.
- Molotov Cocktease from the Adult Swim animated series The Venture Bros. is a former KGB agent who went freelance, presumably after the dissolution of the Soviet Union.
- One of the major antagonists in the TV series Jericho is a mercenary group called Ravenwood, which is alleged to be inspired by Blackwater Worldwide. They are a subsidiary of a large government contractor and are often operating on private agendas.
- The character Jayne Cobb in the Firefly series is a career mercenary who joined the crew of the Serenity after his previous employer hired him to track their ship only to switch sides when offered a larger percentage and better perks. When later offered a bribe to again switch sides, Jayne refuses. When confronted, he explains that he would have but, "The money wasn't good enough." Despite questionable loyalty, Jayne remained more or less loyal to the Serenity crew until the end of the series.
- The comedy machinima series Red vs. Blue uses the mercenary premise regularly, usually around Tex and Wyoming, who themselves, were freelance mercenaries.
- The soap opera Days of Our Lives features a villain named Stefano DiMera, a wealthy Italian businessman with a history of dabbling in organized crime and terrorism, and who has used a cadre of private mercenaries, including John Black and his own nephew Andre DiMera, to execute some of his more outlandish operations. Flashbacks on this show have included Black leading a team of soldiers in battle in some type of (unidentified) Third-World conflict. DiMera has also kidnapped and brainwashed some of his own antagonists, including Roman Brady, Hope Williams, and Steve Johnson, into serving as his agents.
- In LOST a group of mercenaries come to take over The Island, kidnap Ben Linus, and kill everyone on the Island to completely secure it for their employer, Charles Widmore, so he can exploit the Island's mythical properties for his own gain.
- Shadow Company is a documentary directed by Nick Bicanic and Jason Bourque and narrated by Gerard Butler. It is an introduction to the mercenary and private military company industry, concentrating on the role the industry has been playing in recent conflicts. It was released on DVD in August 2006.
- In SuperNews!, one episode serve as a parody on the Blackwater company, who has hired John Rambo, Boba Fett and the Predator, and Yosemite Sam as their drill sergeant, to search and find Osama bin Laden.

== Music ==
The song "Mercenary Song" off the album Train a Comin' by Steve Earle is about a pair of mercenaries.

The song "Roland the Headless Thompson Gunner" by Warren Zevon recounts the exploits of a Norwegian mercenary in the Congo. Similarly his track "Jungle Work!" does the same, citing "le mercenaire" directly in the lyrics.

The Song "the Hero" by the death metal band Amon Amarth is about a (dying) mercenary. Also their 2016 released album "Jomsviking" is about a historic company of Viking mercenaries.

The song "Straw Dogs" by The Stiff Little Fingers (as they say themselves in an interview on the re-release of their album Nobody's Heroes "a dirty nasty song about a dirty nasty subject") is about mercenaries.

John Cale recorded a song titled "Mercenaries" on his album Sabotage/Live in 1979.

British death metal band Bolt Thrower released an album entitled Mercenary in 1998.

British heavy metal band Iron Maiden has a song titled "The Mercenary", on their album Brave New World. The song's lyrics appear to be inspired by the film Predator.

Irish band Thin Lizzy included a song titled "Soldier Of Fortune" on their album Bad Reputation 1977. The soldier of fortune that appears in the lyrics is Costas Georgiou also called Col. Callan who was executed after the Luanda Trial in 1976.

American singer-songwriter Harry Chapin recorded a song entitled "Mercenaries", which first appeared on his 1977 album Dance Band on the Titanic. A live version of the track appears on 1998's The Bottom Line Encore Collection.

== Board and card games ==
In Magic: The Gathering, 'Mercenary' is one of several 'creature types' game cards can possess. The type was introduced in Ice Age, but became widely used in Mercadian Masques, in 1999. The Mercadian Masque mercenary cards were colored black, representing entropy, darkness, or selfishness. Many of these cards could expedite bringing smaller Mercenaries into play.

In Warhammer, Dogs of War is a mercenary army that can act independently, but it is also possible for other armies (barring Bretonnians) to field Dogs of War units. These units include the Regiments of Renown.

The tabletop wargame setting of BattleTech has countless mercenary units in its Inner Sphere fictional setting, as mercenaries have been a prominent element of the BattleTech universe since its initial publication, and certain famous mercenary commands are even among the most celebrated and prestigious military units in the Inner Sphere. Much of the published BattleTech roleplaying game material, and most of the various BattleTech and MechWarrior videogames, are focused on the exploits of mercenary commands, allowing players the freedom to determine their own paths and to move between different government and Great House factions as employers, as an easy way to explore the various areas and cultures of the setting.

== Computer and video games ==
- The player character of Ace Combat Zero: The Belkan War is "Cipher," a mysterious mercenary fighter pilot who gained infamy among both friendly and enemy pilots during the titular conflict.
- Age of Empires III and Age of Empires III: The War Chiefs allow the player to hire foreign mercenaries.
- Armored Core features a mercenary organization consisting of mecha pilots.
- Army of Two and Army of Two: The 40th Day focus on a pair of mercenaries.
- Batman: Arkham City features a specialized team of highly trained mercenaries, contracted from clandestine private security agency "Tyger".
- Mercenaries from the board game BattleTech are featured in several MechWarrior games.
- In Bladestorm: The Hundred Years' War, the player commands a group of mercenaries.
- In Borderlands, players control one of four mercenaries and traverse the fictional planet of Pandora in search of a mysterious "Vault," which is said to contain priceless riches.
- In Call of Duty: Black Ops II, narco-terrorist Raul Menendez uses Cuban and Central American mercenaries to attack China and NATO.
- In Call of Juarez: The Cartel, a bankrupt PMC known as Peacekeepers International becomes a rogue group that supplies weapons to the Mendoza Cartel.
- In Chromehounds, mercenary organization Rafzakael guides the player throughout the story mode and the online mode.
- In Far Cry 2, players control one of nine mercenaries in a fictional African conflict and are tasked with eliminating a local arms dealer.
- In the Treasures of Aht Urgan expansion for Final Fantasy XI, players are recruited into the "Salaheem's Sentinels" mercenary company, for which they can take on various missions called "Assaults" to receive rewards.
- In Final Fantasy VII, protagonist Cloud Strife works as a mercenary.
- In Fire Emblem: Path of Radiance and Fire Emblem: Radiant Dawn, protagonist Ike is the leader of a mercenary group employed by other kingdoms. Additionally, most games in the series feature the "mercenary" as a basic sword-wielding character class.
- Several different mercenary groups appear in the 2008 video game Fallout 3; most are presented as antagonists to the player.
- Grand Theft Auto V features the private military company "Merryweather Security".
- In the Halo universe, the Kig-Yar (Jackal) species are employed as mercenaries and privateers and commonly deployed as scouts, snipers, or special infantry.
- Jagged Alliance focuses on a team of mercenaries carrying out several missions in fictional underdeveloped nations.
- In Killzone: Mercenary, players take on the role of a mercenary who fights for both the "Interplanetary Strategic Alliance" (ISA) and the "Helghan Empire".
- In Just Cause 2, the protagonist Rico Rodriguez is employed by a U.S. three letter Agency and acts as a mercenary known as "Scorpio" when helping the three major criminal factions. Upon completing Just Cause 2, the player unlocks "Mercenary Mode," allowing Rico to finish any remaining missions, races, and other potential activities around the Republic of Panau.
- In Mercenaries: Playground of Destruction, the player controls one of three mercenaries in North Korea, and is able to accept mercenary contracts from the Allied Nations, South Korea, China, and the Russian Mafia. In the sequel, Mercenaries 2: World in Flames, which is set in Venezuela, the three mercenaries accept contracts from new contractors being underwritten by the contractors from the first game, while assembling a private military company of their own.
- Metal Gear Solid 4: Guns of the Patriots and Metal Gear Solid V: The Phantom Pain both feature PMCs.
- In Mount & Blade and its sequel Mount & Blade: Warband, the player character can hire mercenary units at taverns in all cities. They cost more than normal units recruited from villages both in initial cost and upkeep.
- In Project Wingman, Air Combat, Ace Combat 2 and Zero, players may participate as mercenary pilots.
- In Team Fortress 2, the player controls one of nine mercenaries in a corporate war.
- In Red Faction, "mercs" are used by the corporation ULTOR to kill rioting miners before the Earth Defense Forces arrive.
- Mercenaries are featured across the Resident Evil series. This includes groups that provide mercenary services, such as the U.B.C.S., and characters such as Hunk and Jack Krauser.
- In Resident Evil: Operation Raccoon City, "Wolfpack" is a mercenary group employed by Umbrella Corporation. They are dispatched into Raccoon City to run various missions on behalf of Umbrella's interests ranging from destruction of physical evidences to assassination of incriminating eyewitnesses.
- Soldier of Fortune depicts a Capitol Hill conspiracy involving specialized mercenaries hired by G8 and the United Nations.
- In Splinter Cell: Conviction, Sam Fisher encounters ruthless private military company "Black Arrow".
- In the S.T.A.L.K.E.R. series, mercenaries are one of the main factions in the story. In S.T.A.L.K.E.R.: Clear sky, the player controls a mercenary.
- In Strike Commander, the player runs a mercenary air force.
- In the Total War series, battalions of mercenaries can be hired at inns, such as in Medieval: Total War 1, or in the field, such as in Rome: Total War.
- In Xenoblade Chronicles 2, Vandham ran a mercenary group in Garfont Village before his death, with the position being passed to Rex afterward. In-game, Blades can be sent out on Merc Missions, which grant various rewards.
- In Cyberpunk 2077, the protagonist V is a mercenary. Aside from the main storyline, players can take on side missions called gigs.

== A toast ==
A mercenary toast: "Vive la mort, vive la guerre, vive le sacré mercenaire" (Long live death, long live war, long live the sacred mercenary) was used in the novel and film The Dogs of War (1980). It is also mentioned in a couple of books. There is a similar toast to the French Foreign Legion which pre-dates the film "Vive la mort, vive la guerre, vive la Légion Etrangère".

== See also ==
- Yojimbo (film)
