= Christopher Fox =

Christopher Fox may refer to:

- Christopher Fox (composer) (born 1955), English composer
- Christopher Fox (actor) (born 1974), English actor
- Christopher Fox, Baron Fox
- Christopher Fox, father of Religious Society of Friends founder George Fox
