= List of war films and TV specials =

War depictions in film and television include documentaries, TV mini-series, and drama serials depicting aspects of historical wars.

== The Age of Extremes: The Short 20th Century (1914–1945) ==
Note: From World War I to World War II

== The Age of Extremes: The Short 20th Century (1945–2001) ==
Note: From the start of the Cold War until the end in 1990s

== Mercenaries in the third world ==
(See also: Mercenaries in popular culture: Films)

- Geschwader Fledermaus (Bat Squadron) (1957)
- Der lachende Mann – Bekenntnisse eines Mörders (The Laughing Man – Confessions of a Killer) (1966)
- Africa Addio (Africa – Blood and Guts) (1966)
- The Last Mercenary (1968)
- Seduto alla sua destra (Black Jesus) (1968)
- Dark of the Sun/The Mercenaries (1968)
- Sette Baschi Rossi (The Red Berets) (1969)
- The Last Grenade (1970)
- High Velocity (1976)
- Scorticateli Vivi (Wild Geese Attack/Skin 'Em Alive) (1978)
- The Wild Geese (1978)
- The Dogs of War (1981)
- Code Name: Wild Geese (1984)
- Commando Leopard (1985)
- Men of War (1994)
- Mister BOB (2011) (TV)
- Soldiers of Fortune (2012)

== See also ==
- War film
- Combat in film
- Middle Ages in film
- Historical drama
- List of World War II films
- List of films set in the Interwar period
- List of historical drama films and series set in Near Eastern and Western civilization
