= Ultimate Force =

UK television series

- Genre: Drama; Military drama; Action; Adventure
- Created by: Rob Heyland; Chris Ryan
- Starring: Ross Kemp; Tony Curran; Jamie Draven; Alex Reid; Miles Anderson; Christopher Fox; Sam Callis; Heather Peace
- Theme music composer: Rick Wentworth
- Composer: Rick Wentworth
- Country of origin: United Kingdom
- Original language: English
- No. of series: 4
- No. of episodes: 21 (list of episodes)

Production
- Executive producer: Brian True-May
- Producers: Ian Strachan; Peter Norris
- Running time: 50–100 minutes
- Production company: Bentley Productions

Original release
- Network: ITV
- Release: 16 September 2002 – 1 June 2008

Ultimate Force is a British action drama television series that was shown on ITV, which deals with the activities of Red Troop of the SAS (Special Air Service). The first episode was broadcast on 16 September 2002, and a total of four series were produced. The series starred Ross Kemp as central character Staff Sergeant Henry 'Henno' Garvie. The show was initially described as a star vehicle for Kemp, who had been lured away from the BBC to ITV with a multimillion-pound contract. Kemp appeared in every episode of the four series.

The series was co-created by Chris Ryan, a former British SAS soldier who was a member of the famous Bravo Two Zero patrol during the 1991 Gulf War. The series was produced by Bentley Productions.

== Background ==
As well as his behind the scenes role, creator Chris Ryan appeared in the first series of the show playing Blue Troop leader Johnny Bell.

A number of the cast featuring in the first two series did not return to appear in the third series, resulting in a change of characters.

Domestically, the change of format seemed to produce diminishing returns for ITV. The third series was abruptly taken off air by the network midway through the run, only to return a few weeks later. The show was then moved to Saturday evenings at 9 p.m. A similar fate awaited series four, which was pulled after just two episodes. The three remaining episodes of the fourth series were not originally shown on ITV, but shown on ITV4, in January and February 2007. ITV showed the remaining three episodes of the series over a year later, starting on 18 May 2008. The DVD of the fourth series had previously been released on 25 September 2006. ITV then announced there would not be a fifth series, partially due to low ratings—hence the cutting of series three and four midway through their runs—whilst many of the stars moved onto other projects.

Ross Kemp went on to host a series of documentaries following the progress of British Army troops in Afghanistan, whilst both Sam Callis and Christopher Fox joined ITV's police serial drama The Bill portraying Sgt Callum Stone and DS Max Carter, respectively, from 2007 to the end of the series in 2010. Many plotlines throughout the series were left unanswered: most notably, the killing of Iain Macalwain by Henno, the conflict in Pete Twamley's marriage, and the murder of Jamie Dow's step-dad, which is hinted to have been carried out by Ricky Mann. DVD sales of the first two series resulted in more than £700,000 of revenue by the arrival of the third series, with both regular and limited edition sets making the top ten of the television sales charts. The series has also been aired in 120 countries, ranging from Europe to Southeast Asia.

== Cast ==
The cast of the first series of Ultimate Force (from L–R): Sergeant Pete Twamley, Corporal Ricky Mann, Trooper Jamie Dow, Staff Sergeant Henry "Henno" Garvie, Trooper Alex Leonard and Lance Corporal Jem Poynton.

=== Red Troop ===
- Ross Kemp as Staff Sergeant Henry-George "Henno" Garvie; Red Troop SNCO and the only character to appear in every episode
- Christopher Fox as Corporal Louis Hoffman (Series 1, Episode 3; Series 2–4); passes selection in Episode 3 of Series 1, and becomes a main character from Series 2
- Jamie Draven as Trooper Jamie Dow (Series 1–2); K.I.A. at the start of Series 3. Draven did not return for Series 3, and so a body double was used for the death scene
- Tony Curran as Corporal/Sergeant Pete Twamley (Series 1–2); K.I.A. at the start of Series 3. Curran did not return for Series 3, and so a body double was used for the death scene
- Danny Sapani as Corporal Ricky Mann (Series 1–2); K.I.A. at the start of Series 3. Sapani did not return for Series 3, and so a body double was used for the death scene
- Sendhil Ramamurthy as Trooper Alex Leonard (Series 1); leaves the army at the end of Series 1, partly because of the death of his brother
- Elliot Cowan as Lance Corporal Jem Poynton (Series 1 – Series 2, Episode 1); K.I.A. in a shoot out with French special forces in Series 2
- Heather Peace as Trooper Becca Gallagher (Series 3–4); passes selection and joins Red Troop in Series 3, and stays for the remainder of the series
- Louis Decosta Johnson as Corporal Dave Woolston (Series 3–4); joins Red Troop in Series 3, and stays for the remainder of the series
- Liam Garrigan as Corporal Ed Dwyer (Series 3); passes selection in Series 3 and joins Red Troop; K.I.A. between Series 3 and 4 in an unknown incident, and buried at the start of Series 4
- Jamie Michie as Corporal Finn Younger (Series 4); joins Red Troop at the start of Series 4

=== Officers ===
- Miles Anderson as Colonel Aidan Dempsey; commanding officer of 22 Regiment, and the only character apart from Garvie and Hoffman to appear in all four series
- Alex Reid as Captain Caroline Walshe (Series 1–2); Reid did not return for Series 3, the character supposedly having been reassigned by Dempsey
- Jamie Bamber as Captain Dennis "Dotsy" Doheny (Series 1–2); resigns to take the fall for the incident with French special forces in Series 2
- Richard Armitage as Captain Ian Macalwain (Series 2); Red Troop Commander, replacing Captain Doheny; he was killed by Garvie at the end of Series 2
- Sam Callis as Captain Patrick Fleming (Series 4); Red Troop Commander, replacing Captain Macalwain

=== Attache ===
- Tobias Menzies as Box 500 (Series 1); MI5 attaché
- Lucy Akhurst as Pru Banks (Series 2); MI5 attaché, replacing Box 500
- Hannah Yelland as Kathy Crampton (Series 3); MI5 attaché, replacing Pru Banks

=== Minor characters ===
- Chris Ryan as Staff Sergeant Johnny Bell (Series 1); head of Blue Troop (SNCO)
- Derek Horne as Sergeant Sean Smith (Series 2–3); head of Blue Troop (SNCO)
- Anthony Howell as Trooper Sam Leonard (Series 1); member of Red Troop, K.I.A. in the first episode
- Laurence Fox as Corporal Mick Sharp (Series 1); passes selection, and later joins Red Troop in the final episode of the series
- Jackie Morrison as Laura Twamley (Series 1–2); long suffering wife of Pete Twamley
- Liz White as Beth Dow; sister of Jamie Dow
- Paul Brightwell as Sergeant Konchalovsky
- Richard Klvac as Sergeant Tarkovsky
- Goran Kostic as Sergeant Pudovkin
- Valentine Pelka as Colonel Bundarchuk
- Julian Rivett as Klimov
- Igor Urdenko as Mikhailov
- Adam Fogerty as Taras Rustum
- Oleg Stefan as Pyotr

== Episode list ==
Series	Episodes	Originally released	
Series	Episodes	First released	Last released
1	6	16 September 2002	12 October 2002
2	6	18 June 2003	23 July 2003
3	4	8 January 2005	7 May 2005
4	5	29 April 2006	25 September 2006

=== Series 1 (2002) ===
No. overall	No. in series	Title	Directed by	Written by	Original release date	UK viewers (millions)
1	1	"The Killing House"	Diarmuid Lawrence	Rob Heyland	16 September 2002	6.36
Lives are in danger when Red Troop is called in to take command of a bank siege. The team loses Corporal Sam Leonard, new recruit Alex's brother, shot in the leg by one of the X-rays. Sam was a man down, but, having had it drilled into him by Henno, other new recruit Jamie leaves Sam to die and carries on and finishes the job. Alex can't come to terms with this and thus begins the friction between the new recruits—but who will last the distance?
2	2	"Just a Target"	Tom Clegg	Rob Heyland	18 September 2002	5.79
Red Troop is scrambled to uncover an anti-globalist sniper suspected of carrying out an assassination attempt on a prominent European banker. Jamie is considered the man for the job and sent in to the thick of the action. He is deeply embroiled with the enemy as he covertly infiltrates them and offers his services as a crack shot. They're happy as they have a fantastic shot to see through their masterplan, but will Jamie blow his cover or actually kill his target?
3	3	"Natural Selection"	Tom Clegg	Rob Heyland	25 September 2002	6.59
Ten hopeful recruits face their toughest challenge yet: a three-day combat survival course. When two soldiers are found murdered, the hunt is on for the killer. This episode also sees the introduction of Corporal Louis Hoffman, the third longest serving character after Henno and Dempsey.
4	4	"Breakout"	Tom Clegg	Rob Heyland & Julian Jones	2 October 2002	6.75
Red Troop is called to a pharmaceutical laboratory after three Chechens break into an area where scientists are working on a vaccine for a deadly form of anthrax.
5	5	"The Killing of a One-Eyed Bookie"	Tim Leandro	Len Collin	9 October 2002	6.51
Jamie, while impersonating politician Bill Gracey, is dramatically ambushed and kidnapped by terrorists in Northern Ireland. Against orders, Henno and Pete give chase.
6	6	"Something to Do with Justice"	Tim Leandro	Rob Heyland	12 October 2002	4.90
Henno and Twamley are kicked out of the regiment for disobedience. Under Johnny Bell's (Chris Ryan) command, the others are sent on a classified mission to Bosnia to "lift" wily war criminal Savo Glasnovic (Andreas Wisniewski), who has many doubles (like Saddam Hussein), the only problem being that Glasnovic's henchmen are being trained by the newly discharged Henno and Pete.

=== Series 2 (2003) ===
No. overall	No. in series	Title	Directed by	Written by	Original release date	UK viewers (millions)
7	1	"Communication"	Tom Clegg	Rob Heyland	18 June 2003	6.43
A ship, the Dowager Joan, docks at Southampton with a suspicious crew. Jamie and Henno sneak on board to plant a tracker, but the operation goes wrong and they are forced to kill a man, with Caroline caught in the crossfire while making their escape. To make matters worse, it later becomes known to Red Troop that the very well armed members aboard the ship were French special forces.
8	2	"Mad Dogs"	Tom Clegg	Rob Heyland	25 June 2003	6.13
The firefight against French special forces aboard the Dowager Joan has left Jem dead and Caroline in a coma, while the rest of Red Troop face a full judicial inquiry that could land them in jail. The only way out is for one of them to resign—Captain Dotsy Doheny does the honourable thing, as he was the officer commanding on the day. Pete discovers that his wife was the one who blocked his return to ops.
9	3	"Wannabes"	Tim Leandro	Len Collin	2 July 2003	6.15
Red Troop targets a hard-right group of suicide bombers, who are responsible for blowing up a nightclub and a café. The leader of the group is a sinister racist man, who is taught a painful lesson by Pete Twamley, with Ricky in tow. The main manipulator with the group is an attractive school teacher, who uses her feminine charms to lure the male students she teaches into her trap.
10	4	"The List"	Jeremy Webb	Len Collin	9 July 2003	5.89
An unofficial black bag heist is offered to Red Troop to steal a list of terrorist targets from a virtually impenetrable vault. If they are caught, the SAS will disown them. Red Troop wonder how to do it, and there is one simple answer: to intercept a safe cracker during the midst of a burglary and blackmail him into assisting them to break in one of the most secure vaults in the UK.
11	5	"What in the Name of God"	Tom Clegg	Rob Heyland	16 July 2003	5.90
Red Troop is called to a siege at a religious commune where Gulf War veteran Donald "Omega" Clissmann (Conor Mullen) is holed up with his disciples after shooting dead two police officers.
12	6	"Dead is Forever"	Tom Clegg	Rob Heyland	23 July 2003	6.63
The SAS face losing their leader when Dempsey is taken captive while protecting the Overseas Development Minister in a top secret visit to Tbilisi, Georgia.

=== Series 3 (2005) ===
No. overall	No. in series	Title	Directed by	Written by	Original release date	UK viewers (millions)
13	1	"Deadlier Than the Male"	Richard Holthouse	Rob Heyland	8 January 2005	5.34
Red Troop are propelled from a tragic shootout in Iraq to a plane hijack in London, as terrorists fighting for a free Tibet threaten to blow up a passenger flight to Hong Kong. The opening dramatic scene sees the deaths of Trooper Jamie Dow, who had "half his face ripped off". Corporal Ricky Mann who had "fourteen rounds in his back and he didn't see where they were coming from" and Sergeant Pete Twamley who they put "sandbags in his coffin because there wasn't enough to fill a mess tin". Captain Caroline Walshe and Pru Banks also leave the show, apparently dropped from Red Troop by Dempsey. Back at Hereford, the selection process is coming to an end, and new recruits are desperately needed, as Red Troop is depleting in numbers. The new group of recruits are a very promising crowd; however; to Dempsey's disgust, one of them is a woman. Becca aims to be the first woman to pass selection. When the terrorists ask for a female pilot, Henno decides to put the wannabe trooper in the front line.
14	2	"Never Go Back"	Richard Holthouse	Rob Heyland	15 January 2005	5.33
Red Troop is caught in a vicious confrontation between rival forces in Zimbabwe during an unofficial visit to a farm owned by Dempsey's cousins Alex and Sarah Du Preez. Henno and the team face overwhelming odds when brutal leader Colonel Gagmandawe and his soldiers surround the farm. Their only escape is through a crocodile-infested river, but the battle is far from over.
15	3	"The Class of 1980"	Tim Leandro	Len Collin	22 January 2005	5.17
Henno comes face to face with Al-Qaeda when terrorists seize the Italian Consulate. The notorious Al Djouf threatens to blow up a truck using his mobile phone, unless all prisoners held in Guantanamo Bay are released. The SAS attacks and mobile networks are shut down, but Al Djouf has friends on both sides and the clock is ticking towards an explosion in the capital.
16	4	"Weapon of Choice"	Tom Clegg	Len Collin	7 May 2005	4.37
The SAS is sent to Chechnya to find rebel leader Movzar Mazayev (Kristijan Nincic). Henno mistrusts Russian special forces agent Vasily, who is assigned to help them. The soldiers close in on Movzar's fiery sister Sapiyat, but intelligence officer Kathy is taken hostage. In this conflict, where political ideals and personal tragedy overlap, can Red Troop bring down their targets and rescue Kathy?

=== Series 4 (2006) ===
No. overall	No. in series	Title	Directed by	Written by	Original release date	UK viewers (millions)
17	1	"Changing of the Guard"	Mark Roper	Charlie Fletcher	29 April 2006	4.08
With newly appointed Captain Fleming in place, Red Troop are dispatched to a former Soviet state in a race to save the kidnapped daughters of a British diplomat. As the rest of the troop track the armed rebels through dense forest, Henno is left behind at base where he comes to suspect there is a mole amongst them.
18	2	"Charlie Bravo"	Richard Holthouse	Rob Heyland	6 May 2006	4.35
Red Troop fly to Colombia to train a hopeless contingent of local soldiers for an upcoming assault on a cocaine factory. Without warning, the mission is brought forward and Henno begins to suspect a hidden agenda. Will Red Troop be able to save this shambolic platoon from certain death?
19	3	"The Dividing Line"	Laurence Moody	Alan Whiting	25 September 2006; 18 May 2008 (Network premiere)	3.82
Red Troop are drafted in with their American counterparts to apprehend an infamous Al-Qaeda terrorist in the White Mountains of Afghanistan. Tensions run high as the troops battle for control. Can they overcome their rivalry in time to stop the terrorist before he implements his co-ordinated attacks against the West? This episode features the Hunt for Hassan.
20	4	"Violent Solutions"	Mark Roper	Rob Heyland	25 September 2006; 25 May 2008 (Network premiere)	3.80
Red Troop monitor a suspected weapons dealer, Griffin, who leads them into an armed stand-off with an East End drugs gang. When the gang hijack a tour bus, Becca places herself in the line of fire. Can Red Troop stop the hijackers before Becca's true identity is revealed?
21	5	"Slow Bomb"	Laurence Moody	Charlie Fletcher	25 September 2006; 1 June 2008 (Network premiere)	4.03
When a routine security check on a nuclear power plant goes disastrously wrong, Red Troop find themselves hunting the mercenaries responsible for stealing a canister of radioactive Cobalt 90. As London is shut down, Red Troop race to stop the detonation of a dirty bomb and the certain devastation of the capital. With the seconds ticking away can Henno disarm the bomb and save the capital?

== Broadcasters ==
Country	TV Network(s)	Series Premiere	Weekly Schedule	Alternate Title and notes
United Kingdom	ITV; CBS Action	Thursdays 9:00 p.m. / Sundays 9:00 p.m.		
Argentina	FX	Wednesday 11:00 p.m.		
Sweden	Viasat Crime	Friday 9:00 p.m. / Saturday 9:00 p.m.		
Dominican Republic	FX	Wednesday 11:00 p.m.		
(Australia) Australia^{1, 3}	Seven Network; Seven HD; BBC UKTV	Saturday 10:30 p.m.		
France	NT1; France 4^{4}	8 September 2005; 1 July 2008	Thursday 8:00 p.m. Tuesday 8:00 p.m.	
Hungary	Viasat 3			Terrorkommandó
Italy	AXN; 7 Gold	6 February 2007; 12 November 2008	Tuesday 9:00 p.m. Wednesday 11:15 p.m.	
Republic of Ireland	TV3	Thursday 9:00 p.m.		
Japan	WOWOW			S.A.S.: 英国特殊部隊^{2}
New Zealand	TV ONE			
Iceland	Sjónvarpið			Víkingasveitin
Poland	Tele 5			Komandosi
United States	BBC America, Tubi TV	25 September 2007,	Tuesday 9:00 p.m.	As of October 2017 all episodes are available to stream on Tubi TV
Serbia	TV Avala	1 May 2010	Saturdays 2:15 p.m.	Krajnja sila

- ^{1} Originally aired on the Nine Network, though sporadically. Only the first four episodes of Series 1 aired. The Seven Network then bought the rights to show Ultimate Force, but started at Series 2. Series 2 episodes were shown on the weekly schedule of Wednesday at 10:30 p.m.
- ^{2} Title means S.A.S.: British Special Forces.
- ^{3} Also being aired on the UK.TV channel via Australian Pay TV networks.
- ^{4} With slight changes in the episodes' order, due to French TV regulation for youth protection: some episodes considered as too violent and can't be aired before 10:00pm. E.g. Series 3, Episode 2 has been aired in the middle of Series 1, at 10:45 p.m. after two episodes of Series 1.

== See also ==
- SAS: Who Dares Wins
- Hunting Chris Ryan

British military dramas:

- Soldier Soldier
- Red Cap
- Spearhead
- Our Girl

American military dramas:

- The Brave—similar type of series but focused on a fictional Defense Intelligence Agency unit
- SEAL Team—similar type of series but focused on the United States Navy SEALs
- Six—similar type of series but focused on the United States Navy SEALs
- The Unit—similar type of series but focused on the United States Army's Delta Force
