= The A-Team (disambiguation) =

The A-Team is an NBC television series that aired from 1983 to 1987.

The A-Team may also refer to:

== Arts, entertainment, and media ==
=== Music ===
==== Groups ====
- The rap/ hip-hop duo, consisting of Aceyalone and Abstract Rude
- The Nashville A-Team, a group of session musicians in the 1950s and 1960s

==== Songs ====
- "The A Team" (Barry Sadler song), 1966
- "The A Team" (Ed Sheeran song), 2011
- The A-Team § Theme song, single by Mike Post, 1984
- "The A-team", a song by Conflict from the album The Final Conflict. 1996
- "A-Team", a song by Travis Scott, 2016

=== Other uses in arts, entertainment, and media ===
- The A-Team (comics), various comics based on the TV series
- The A-Team (film), a 2010 feature film based on the TV series
- The A-Team, the shared name for a series of video games based on the series

== Other uses ==
- A-Team (Special Forces), a company subunit of U.S. Army Special Forces
- Athletes in Temporary Employment as Agricultural Manpower, a short-lived 1964 program to replace migrant labor from the Bracero Program with high school students developed by U.S. Secretary of Labor W. Willard Wirtz
- A-Team, the name for the rugby league reserve team
- Ateam Inc., a Japanese Internet company
- Clerkenwell crime syndicate, also known as the A-team, a London criminal gang
- The A-Team company which developed Action Quake 2

== See also ==
- Team A, a sub-group of Japanese girl group AKB48
- List of A1 Grand Prix teams
