= Elite World Cops =

- Title card
- Also known as: Chris Ryan's Elite World Cops
- Genre: Documentary
- Presented by: Chris Ryan
- Country of origin: United Kingdom
- Original language: English
- No. of seasons: 1
- No. of episodes: 7

Production
- Running time: 1 hour
- Production company: Back2Back Productions

Original release
- Network: Bravo
- Release: 11 November – 23 December 2008

Elite World Cops is a television series starring former SAS soldier and author Chris Ryan. Ryan travels the world meeting some of the world's most elite police units. The format of the show usually involves Ryan training with the unit, observing tactics and hardware and comparing them to his own experiences in the SAS. The show aired on Bravo from the 11th of November until the 23rd of December 2008 in the United Kingdom. It also aired in the USA's National Geographic Channel under the pseudonym Shadow Soldiers.

== Season 1 episode list ==
1) JUNGLAS, Ryan joins a special police unit in Colombia who are trained to operate in the jungle. After training he is invited to take part in operations locating and destroying a cocaine drug lab in the jungle and supervising civilians destroying coca plantations and providing them with protection.

2) BOPE, short for Batalhão de Operações Policiais Especiais, Rio de Janeiro's special weapons and tactics team. The operation involves a visit to some of the town's favelas where the police are trying to take back the streets from drug dealers and gangs.

3) SUNKAR, Kazakh police special unit. Training involves CQB, Close Quarters Battle, training and using many pieces of old Soviet hardware including the Soviet built BTR-80 APC and RPGs. The operation involves stopping drug traffickers trying to smuggle heroin through Kazakhstan and the arrests of a group trying to harvest a cannabis plantation.

4) BOA, Poland's Bureau of counter-terrorist operations (Biuro Operacji Antyterrorystycznych), tasked with operations that the normal police can not handle and since September 11 also tasked with counter-terrorism. Training includes fast roping and explosive entry to buildings as well as helicopter extraction. During the real operation the team, including Ryan, are ordered to storm a house and detain an arms dealer that is believed to be living there.

5) MAGAV, Chris joins the MAGAV (Israeli Border Police) Elite Counter-Terror Undercover Unit called Yamas, which operates in Palestinian controlled cities and territories, tracking and arresting terrorists in different ways.

6) STF, Ryan joins the Special Task Force of Sri Lanka Police, in their fight against the Tamil Tigers. He learns strategic driving, and urban warfare and fighting in the jungle. He goes on a mission to track down and arrest two Tamil Tiger scouts on a watchpost, and a small scale training operation involving the use of C4 in a warehouse.

7) GOPES. Ryan joins the Special Operations Group, an operative tactical group and special task force of the Federal Police of Mexico, on their hunt for gangs and local drug labs. He is also involved in a large training exercise involving a Boeing 727-200 in a hostage situation.
