= Christopher Fox (actor) =

British actor

- Born: 23 June 1974 (age 50)
- Occupation(s): Actor, narrator
- Years active: 1995–present

Christopher Fox (born 23 June 1974) is a British actor and narrator. He is best known for playing Corporal Louis Hoffman in Ultimate Force from 2002 to 2008 and DS Max Carter in The Bill between December 2007 and August 2010, as well as being the narrator on the documentary series Police Interceptors from 2008 to 2015. Fox was born to an English father and Polish mother and is fluent in the Polish language.

== Filmography ==
- Doctors ....DS Dean Cunningham (2014)
- The Bill ....DS Max Carter (2007-2010)
- The Bill ....Keith Harkness (2007)
- Ultimate Force ....Corporal Louis Hoffman (2002-2008)
- Blitz: London's Firestorm ....Bill Reagan (2005)
- The Inspector Lynley Mysteries ....DC Lee Turner (2004)
- Death in Holy Orders ....Police Officer (2003)
- Foyle's War ....Jack Winters (2004)
- Othello ....PC Adey (2001)
- The Sins ....Sarge (2000)
- The Vice ....Trevor Cairns (2000)
- Dangerfield ....Harry (1999)
- All the King's Men (1999 film) ....Soldier (1999)
- The Colour of Justice ....Jamie Acourt (1999)
- The Window ....Police Officer #2 (1998)
- A Woman of Independent Means ....Drew #2 (1995)
