= The A Team (Barry Sadler song) =

"The "A" Team"

Single by Barry Sadler

from the album The 'A' Team
- B-side: "An Empty Glass"
- Released: April 11, 1966
- Recorded: 1966
- Genre: Patriotic
- Length: 2:05
- Label: RCA Victor
- Songwriters: Leonard Whitcup Cimino; Barry Sadler; Phyllis Fairbanks
- Producer: Andy Wiswell

Barry Sadler singles chronology
"The Ballad of the Green Berets" (1966)	"The "A" Team" (1966)	"One Day Nearer Home" (1966)

"The "A" Team" is a 1966 song and charting single by Staff Sergeant Barry Sadler. It was Sadler's second and final American patriotic hit song at the time of the Vietnam War, following the success of "The Ballad of the Green Berets".

== Meaning ==
The song's lyrics are about the basic twelve-man Special Forces unit. It is a marching song in six-eight time with music by Leonard Whitcup Cimino to lyrics by Barry Sadler and Phyllis Fairbanks. The lyrics commence "12 men strong and true 12 men fight for you on their heads a beret of green 12 men, invincible, the A-Team."

== Overview ==
"The A Team", the title song to Sadler's second album, made it to No. 28 on the U.S. Billboard Hot 100 on that year, but its success was seen as a disappointment following the No. 1 "Ballad of the Green Berets".
