= The Ballad of the Green Berets =

Single by Barry Sadler

from the album Ballads of the Green Berets
- B-side: "Letter from Vietnam"
- Released: January 1966
- Recorded: December 18, 1965
- Studio: RCA Victor, New York City
- Genre: Country; march
- Length: 2:27
- Label: RCA Victor
- Songwriters: Robin Moore; Barry Sadler
- Producer: Andy Wiswell

Barry Sadler singles chronology
"The Ballad of the Green Berets" (1966)	"The A Team" (1966)

"The Ballad of the Green Berets" is a 1966 patriotic song co-written and performed by Barry Sadler, in the style of a ballad about the United States Army Special Forces. It was one of the few popular songs of the Vietnam War years to cast the military in a positive light.

The song became a major hit in January 1966, reaching number one for five weeks on the Billboard Hot 100, and was ranked number one of that chart's most successful songs of 1966. It was also a crossover hit, reaching number one on Billboard's Easy Listening chart and number two on Billboard's Country survey. "The Ballad of the Green Berets" was the most commercially successful topical song of the Vietnam War era.

== Background ==
Sadler began writing the song while he was training to be a Special Forces medic. After earning his Parachutist Badge, Sadler knew one line of the song would mention "silver wings upon their chests." Author Robin Moore, who wrote the book The Green Berets, helped him write the lyrics and later sign a recording contract with RCA Records. The demonstration tape of the song was produced in a rudimentary recording studio at Fort Bragg, North Carolina, with the help of Gerry Gitell and Lieutenant General William P. Yarborough.

The lyrics were written, in part, in honor of U.S. Army Specialist 5 James Gabriel Jr., a Special Forces operator and the first native Hawaiian to die in Vietnam. Gabriel was killed by Viet Cong gunfire while on a training mission with the South Vietnamese Army on April 8, 1962. One verse mentioned Gabriel by name, but it was not used in the recorded version.

Sadler recorded the song and 11 others with Sid Bass at RCA's 24th Street Studios in New York City on December 18, 1965. The song and album, Ballads of the Green Berets, were released in January 1966.

== Release and reception ==
In the United States, "The Ballad of the Green Berets" shipped two million copies in its first five weeks of release, making it the then-fastest selling single in RCA's history. It topped the Billboard Hot 100 in March 1966, staying at number one for five weeks. It placed tenth on the year-end Hot 100 chart published by Billboard in December 1966. When Billboard later revised its year-end rankings for 1966, the song was re-ranked at number one; since then, Billboard has recognized "The Ballad of the Green Berets" as the top Hot 100 song of that year. On Cash Box's 1966 year-end chart, "The Ballad of the Green Berets" tied for first with "California Dreamin'" by the Mamas and the Papas. It was also the number-21 song of the 1960s as ranked by Joel Whitburn. The single sold more than nine million copies.

Sadler performed the song on television on January 30, 1966, on The Ed Sullivan Show, and on other TV shows, including The Hollywood Palace and The Jimmy Dean Show.

"The Ballad of the Green Berets" was uniquely successful in an era of protest songs and anti-Vietnam War sentiment, focusing not on battle but the humanity of the soldiers. Its appearance on the Billboard Country chart, despite not having any overtly country music traits, is a testament to its broad appeal. In terms of sales and chart activity, musicologist R. Serge Denisoff called "The Ballad of the Green Berets" the most successful topical song of the Vietnam War era.

== In film ==
"The Ballad of the Green Berets" was used in the 1968 John Wayne film The Green Berets, based on Robin Moore's book. Though Wayne personally requested the song as his theme, the film's composer, Miklós Rózsa, feared it would sound old-fashioned. Nevertheless, Rózsa made two distinct arrangements of the song for the film's opening and closing credits. Though he considered the results "corny," he realized the charismatic Wayne could "get away" with having the song as his theme. "I don't think anyone mentioned whether the music was good or bad," said Rózsa of the film's predominately negative reviews.

== Charts ==
Chart performance for "The Ballad of the Green Berets"
Chart (1966)	Peak position
Germany (Official German Charts)	4
Netherlands (Dutch Top 40)	31
New Zealand (Listener)	7
South Africa (Springbok Radio SA Top 20)	1
UK Singles (Official Charts)	24
US Billboard Hot 100	1
US Adult Contemporary (Billboard)	1
US Hot Country Songs (Billboard)	2

== Certifications ==
Certifications for "Ballad of the Green Berets"
Region	Certification	Certified units/sales
United States (RIAA)	Gold	1,000,000^{^}
^{^} Shipments figures based on certification alone.
