= Geordie Sharp =

Geordie Sharp is a fictional character featured in a series of military novels written by Chris Ryan. He is a Sergeant in the British Special Air Service (SAS), and appears in four of Ryan's best-selling works.

== Fictional character history ==
Geordie Sharp (born George Sharp) had an unhappy childhood which prompted him to join the British Army at the age of 16. When he eventually was badged a member of 22 Regiment Special Air Service, he felt as if his life had actually been worth living, through the best and worst of the times. But this begins to change when Sharp returns from the Gulf War, severely wounded after an accident deep in Iraqi-held territory which resulted in his brief internment as a prisoner of war.

Sharp begins to suffer from marriage problems when he is dispatched to Northern Ireland to train with the SAS, but the problem becomes personal when his estranged wife is killed by the Provisional Irish Republican Army and, nearly maddened with sorrow and rage, Geordie goes on a personal vendetta to hunt down the terrorists responsible, putting at risk his entire military career in the process.

He soon finds himself thrown into danger again when the PIRA attempts revenge by forcing Sharp to assassinate the Prime Minister of the United Kingdom by threatening to murder his only son, Timothy Sharp.

A few years after this incident, Sharp is reassigned to Moscow, supposedly to train a Spetnaz unit, although Sharp is secretly expected to plant nuclear explosives under The Kremlin while using the military as his cover. However, he goes on to compromise the entire operation by launching an unauthorized mission against the Chechen Mafia, which leave several Russian gangsters dead. Moscow's underworld is swift to retaliate, kidnapping two of Sharp's SAS contacts and getting control of the nuclear device. Although Geordie is quick to attempt a remedy of the situation before it spins out of control and causes a major international crisis, he finds himself reassigned again at the operation's end, this time to Southern Africa.

Sharp's new post is Kamanga, a former British colony now prone to brutal tribal massacres. The corrupt dictatorship government is led by General Bakunda, a Kaswiri member of the majority northern tribe in Kamanga. The majority southern tribe, the Afundis, wages a brutal guerrilla war against the regime under the direction of their unlikely leader: Gus Muende, Bakunda's former adopted son and an avowed Marxist of mixed European-African ancestry. Geordie and seven other UK military operatives are asked to train one of Bakunda's anti-Afundi death squads, a special forces militia known as the Alpha Commando. Again, things go wrong on the operation's first week, when a member of the team driving a truck strikes and kills a local village boy. The witch doctor in the region puts a curse on Sharp if he refuses to leave Kamanga immediately: Ten white people shall die, and their blood will be on Geordie's head. In the days that follow, the curse comes horribly true: Two South Africans traveling with a German Namibian woman are killed in a plane crash which Sharp witnesses; the woman herself is saved but promptly reveals she is in the Afundis' employ and betrays Sharp to the rebels. One by one, several members of Sharp's team die: The first trampled by an elephant, a second cannibalized by Gus Muende, and a third shot dead during a daring escape attempt. The next three victims are local Afrikaner mercenaries in the employ of a rogue private military corporation: The first is executed by the Alpha Commando, the second is killed trying to help Sharp escape a rebel camp, and the third is thrown out of a helicopter by Geordie himself. The Alpha Commando promptly turn against Sharp and declare him and his team wanted criminals in Kamanga, due to the greed of a major who believes they are in possession of a diamond stolen from a government mine.

It is eventually revealed that this diamond in question was hidden in the plane piloted by the Namibian woman and her companions when it crashed. She subsequently recovers it with Muende's help; the two, facing only inevitable defeat against Bakunda's army as it rapidly intensifies the fighting, decide to go into exile in Central America, dividing the proceeds of the diamond's sale. However, a vengeful Geordie tracks them down, and both are shot dead by a Kamangan soldier. This brings the figure of dead whites since the witch doctor's curse up to nine. While later attempting to stop the rebels from getting their hands on an old stockpile of Soviet warheads, Sharp is exposed to a near-fatal dose of radiation.

He eventually flees Kamanga and soon afterwards learns he may have contracted cancer. This earns Sharp a discharge from the army, and he retires to Northern Ireland to live with his child. However, even there the witch doctor's curse haunts him; his son notes that if Geordie dies from his radiation exposure, the prediction would come true: He would be the tenth white man down.

== Geordie Sharp stories ==
- Stand By, Stand By (1996)
- Zero Option (1997)
- The Kremlin Device (1998)
- Tenth Man Down (1999)
