= Barry Sadler =

American author and musician (1940–1989)

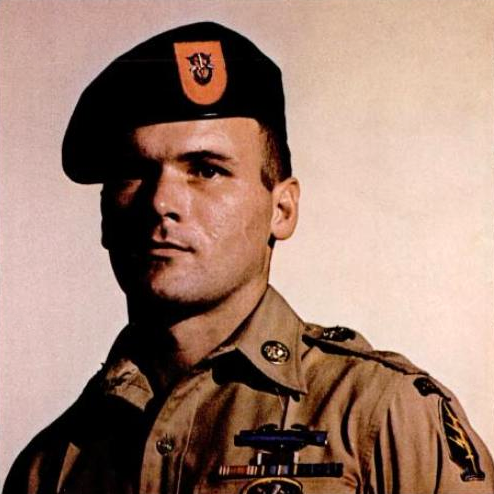
- Sadler in 1966
- Born: Barry Allen Sadler; November 1, 1940; Carlsbad, New Mexico, U.S.
- Died: November 5, 1989 (aged 49); Murfreesboro, Tennessee, U.S.
- Occupations: Singer; songwriter; author
- Known for: "Ballad of the Green Berets"
- Military career
- Allegiance: United States of America
- Branch: U.S. Air Force (1958–1962); U.S. Army (1962–1967)
- Service years: 1958–1967
- Rank: Airman First Class (USAF); Staff Sergeant (USA)
- Unit: U.S. Army Special Forces
- Conflicts: Vietnam War

Barry Allen Sadler (November 1, 1940 – November 5, 1989) was an American singer-songwriter and author whose military service influenced his work. After a stint in the United States Air Force, Sadler served in the United States Army as a Green Beret medic, achieving the rank of staff sergeant. He served in the Vietnam War from late December 1964 to late May 1965. Most of his work has a military theme, and he is best known for his patriotic song "The Ballad of the Green Berets", a number-one hit in 1966. He died in 1989, at age 49, one year after suffering a gunshot wound to the head in Guatemala City.

== Early life ==
Sadler was born in Carlsbad, New Mexico, the second son of John Sadler (1911–1948) and Blanche ("Bebe") Littlefield (1917–2003) of Phoenix, Arizona.

According to Sadler's autobiography, I'm a Lucky One, his father developed a successful plumbing and electrical business in Carlsbad and owned several farms in the area. He describes his mother as managing restaurants and bars, and at times, games in casinos.

The family relocated often. His parents divorced when Sadler was five, and his father died not long after at age 36 from a rare form of nervous system cancer. His mother moved her family around as she worked at temporary jobs in Arizona, California, Colorado, New Mexico, and Texas.

== Career ==
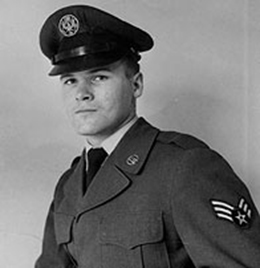
Air Force photo of Barry Sadler in 1961 wearing the rank insignia at the time known as airman first class

=== Enlistment ===
Sadler dropped out of high school in the 10th grade in Leadville, Colorado. In 1958, at 17, he enlisted in the U.S. Air Force. He finished his GED certificate while in the Air Force. He trained as a radar technician in 1958, and was stationed in Japan. After his discharge in 1961, Sadler enlisted in the U.S. Army, and volunteered for Airborne and Special Forces, opting to be a medic.

=== Wounded in action ===
After completing airborne training, he underwent training as a combat medic at Fort Sam Houston, Texas, Fort Jackson, South Carolina, and Fort Bragg, North Carolina. In May 1965, while he was on a combat patrol southeast of Pleiku in the Vietnam Central Highlands, he was severely wounded in the knee by a feces-covered punji stick. Sadler dressed the wound with a cotton swab and an adhesive bandage, then completed the patrol; however, he subsequently developed a serious infection in his leg, and was evacuated to Clark Air Base Hospital in the Philippines. Doctors were forced to surgically enlarge the wound to drain it and to administer large doses of penicillin. Sadler returned to Fort Bragg, where he made a complete recovery.

=== "The Ballad of the Green Berets" ===
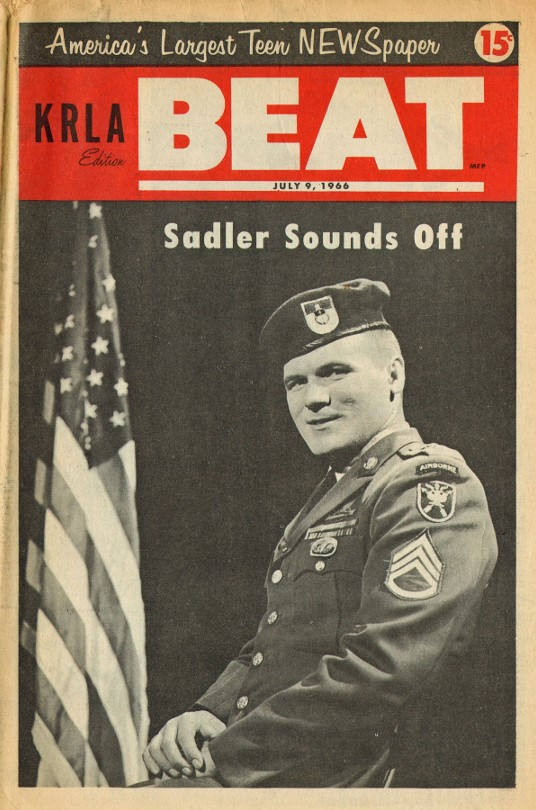
Barry Sadler on the cover of KRLA Beat, July 9, 1966

Sadler recorded his most well-known song, "The Ballad of the Green Berets", a patriotic tune about the Special Forces, in December 1965. Writer Robin Moore, author of the novel The Green Berets, which became a 1968 movie, The Green Berets, featuring John Wayne, helped Sadler with lyrics and with getting a recording contract with RCA Victor Records. "The Ballad of the Green Berets" arranged as a choral version by Ken Darby was the title song of the movie. Moore also wrote an introduction to Sadler's autobiography, I'm a Lucky One, which he dictated to Tom Mahoney and was published by the Macmillan Company in 1967. "The Ballad of the Green Berets" was released by RCA Victor Records in January 1966, and became a fast-selling single, holding number one on the Billboard Hot 100 chart for five consecutive weeks from March 5 to April 2, 1966. The record sold more than nine million copies.

The song was a great success in many U.S. cities; it scored five weeks at number one on the weekly Good Guys music survey at WMCA, the top popular music radio station in New York City during 1966. He sang it for his television debut on January 30 on The Ed Sullivan Show. Sadler had recorded an album of similarly themed songs, which he titled Ballads of the Green Berets. It sold a million copies during the first five weeks of its release. Sadler had a minor success later the same year when the similarly patriotic-themed single "The 'A' Team" scored number 28.

Sadler during 1969, performing with his guitar

== Later years ==
=== Literary works ===
Sadler was unable to score anything close to a major success with his other songs, though "The A-Team" was a top-30 Billboard chart single during 1966. He was honorably discharged from the Army in May 1967, and moved with his family to Tucson, Arizona.

After minor acting parts in four episodes of two TV Western series, Death Valley Days and The High Chaparral, and in the 1968 caper film Dayton's Devils starring Rory Calhoun, he moved to Nashville and began writing pulp-fiction novels. His popular Casca series is about the title character, Casca Rufio Longinius (a combination of Longinus and the Wandering Jew), supposedly the Roman soldier who thrust his lance into Christ's side during the crucifixion. Casca is cursed to remain a soldier until the Second Coming. The novels feature Casca's life from biblical times to the 20th century. Sadler wrote the first 22 books. After his death, the series was continued with books by other authors. (See List of works in the Casca novel series.)

=== Death of Lee Emerson Bellamy ===
On December 1, 1978, around 11 pm, Sadler shot a country music songwriter named Lee Emerson Bellamy, who would die the next day.

The shooting was the culmination of a month-long dispute the men had concerning Darlene Sharpe, who was Bellamy's former girlfriend, and Sadler's lover at the time. Bellamy made many harassing telephone calls to Sadler and Sharpe, had a violent confrontation in a Nashville bar's parking lot, and threatened both their lives.

On the night in question, Bellamy made several threatening telephone calls, including one to the Natchez Trace Restaurant where Sadler and Sharpe were having dinner and drinks with two friends. This resulted in Sadler asking a bartender to telephone the police, who never responded. Bellamy later went to Sharpe's apartment complex and knocked on the door. Sadler exited through a side door. On seeing Sadler, Bellamy fled to his van. Then, Sadler testified, he saw a flash of metal. Believing it to be a gun, he fired one shot. The bullet struck Bellamy between the eyes, and he died several hours later in a Nashville hospital. Bellamy turned out to be unarmed.

According to court records, Sadler had then placed a handgun in Bellamy's van, presumably to strengthen his claim of self-defense. After a plea bargain, on June 1, 1979, Sadler was convicted of voluntary manslaughter for the death of Bellamy, and sentenced to four to five years in prison. His legal team worked to lower the sentence, which a judge reduced to just 30 days in the county workhouse. He served 28 days. Sadler was sued for wrongful death by Bellamy's stepson, and was ordered to pay compensation of about $10,000.

=== Death ===
Sadler moved to Guatemala City in 1984. He continued to write and publish his Casca books and produced a never-released self-defense video. On September 7, 1988, he was shot in the head while sitting in a cab in Guatemala City. His manager, family, and friends believed it to be a robbery. Sadler was flown to the United States by friends in a private jet.

He underwent surgery at the Nashville Veterans Administration Hospital, and remained in a coma for about six weeks. After emerging from the coma, Sadler was a quadriplegic and had suffered significant brain damage. He was released in January 1989 but his family reported him missing. A dispute over who would be his legal guardian erupted between his wife and mother and resulted in a judge mandating a psychiatric evaluation. A few days later, he was found in time to be present at a competency hearing.

After being moved to the Cleveland VA Hospital for specialized treatment, he was removed from the hospital by two former Green Berets and his mother, Blanche (Bebe) Sadler. After a contentious court battle waged by his wife and children, a court in Tennessee ordered that Sadler be put under the care of an independent guardian. He was moved to the VA Hospital in Murfreesboro, Tennessee in February 1989, but he never recovered from his head wound. He died there of cardiac arrest on November 5, 1989, four days after his 49th birthday. Sadler was survived by his wife, Lavona, a daughter, Brooke, and two sons, Thor and Baron. His remains were interred at Nashville National Cemetery on November 8.

== Discography ==
=== Albums ===
Year	Album	Chart Positions		Label
Year	Album	US	US Country	Label
1966	Ballads of the Green Berets	1	1	RCA
1966	The 'A' Team	130	—	RCA
1967	Back Home	—	—	RCA

=== Singles ===
Year	Single	Chart Positions					Album
Year	Single	US AC	US	US Country	CAN	UK	Album
1966	"The Ballad of the Green Berets"	1	1	2	26	24	Ballads of the Green Berets
1966	"The 'A' Team"	6	28	46	58	–	The 'A' Team
