= Chris Ryan =

British army sergeant and author (born 1961)

Chris Ryan MM
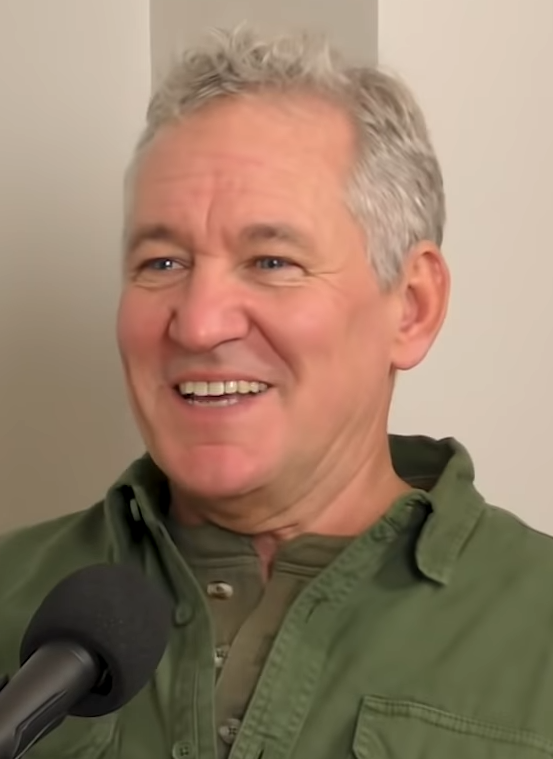
- Born: Colin Armstrong; 1961 (age 64–65); Rowlands Gill, County Durham, England
- Military career
- Allegiance: United Kingdom
- Branch: British Army
- Service years: 1978–1994
- Rank: Sergeant
- Service number: 24496702
- Units: 23 SAS, Hebburn, UK B Squadron, 22 Special Air Service; Parachute Regiment; 23 Special Air Service
- Conflicts: The Troubles; Cambodian–Vietnamese War; Gulf War
- Awards: Military Medal
- Other work: Author, television presenter
- Website: https://www.chrisryanauthor.co.uk/

Colin Armstrong, MM (born 1961), usually known by the pen-name Chris Ryan, is a British author, television presenter, security consultant and former Special Air Service sergeant.

After the publication of fellow patrol member Andy McNab's Bravo Two Zero in 1993, Ryan published his own account of his experiences during the Bravo Two Zero mission in 1995, entitled The One That Got Away. Since retiring from the British Army Ryan has published several fiction and non-fiction books, including Strike Back, which was subsequently adapted into a television series for Sky 1, and co-created the ITV action series Ultimate Force. He has also presented or appeared in numerous television documentaries connected to the military or law enforcement.

== Early life, education and military service ==
Ryan was born in Rowlands Gill in Gateshead. After attending Hookergate School, he enrolled in the British Army at the age of 16. Ryan's cousin was a member of the reservist 23 SAS Regiment and invited Ryan to come up and "see what it's like to be in the army". Ryan did this nearly every weekend, almost passing selection several times, but was too young to do 'test week'. When he was old enough, he passed selection into 23 SAS. Shortly after that he began selection for the regular 22 SAS Regiment and joined 'B' Squadron as a medic. Needing a parent regiment, Ryan and a former sailor who had joined 22 SAS from the Royal Navy, spent eight weeks with the Parachute Regiment before returning to 'B' Squadron.

During the 1980s he was part of an SAS team sent to Thailand by the UK government to train the deposed and internationally-recognised Coalition Government of Democratic Kampuchea (which included elements of the Khmer Rouge) in tactics used against the Vietnamese-backed forces of the People's Republic of Kampuchea during the conflict which followed the invasion of Cambodia by Vietnam in 1979. However Ryan and his team were returned to Britain after the journalist John Pilger published details of the (classified) deployment.

== Bravo Two Zero ==
During the 1991 Gulf War, Ryan was a member of the eight-man SAS patrol with the call sign Bravo Two Zero. The patrol was sent into Iraq to "gather intelligence ... find a good LUP [lying up position] and set up an OP [observation post]" on the main supply route between Baghdad and North-Western Iraq, and destroy the transporter erector launchers used to launch Scud missiles.

The patrol was spotted by Iraqis, and decided to withdraw to Syria on foot. Ryan marched 300 kilometres (190 mi) to the Syrian border in North-Western Iraq. This was the "longest escape and evasion by an SAS trooper or any other soldier", covering 100 miles (160 km) more than SAS trooper Jack Sillito had in the Sahara Desert in 1942.

During his escape, Ryan suffered injuries from drinking water contaminated with nuclear waste. Besides suffering severe muscle atrophy, he lost 36 lb (16 kg) and did not return to operational duties. Instead, he selected and trained potential recruits, before being honourably discharged from the SAS in 1994.

On 29 June 1991 Ryan was awarded the Military Medal "in recognition of gallant and distinguished services in the Gulf in 1991"; the award was not gazetted until 15 December 1998, together with the equally delayed announcement of Andy McNab's Distinguished Conduct Medal.

== Post-military career ==
After leaving the SAS, Ryan wrote The One That Got Away, which covers the account from his patrol report of the Bravo Two Zero mission. Both his and McNab's accounts have been heavily criticised by former territorial SAS member and explorer Michael Asher, who attempted to retrace the patrol's footsteps for TV and claimed to have debunked both accounts with the help of his friend, the then-SAS regimental sergeant major Peter Ratcliffe.

Ryan has written more than 70 books, both fiction and non-fiction. Many of his works are well known, such as fictional works like Strike Back (2007), which was adapted into the TV show, and Firefight (September 2008). He also writes fictional books for teenage readers, including the Alpha Force and Code Red series, and has written a romantic novel, The Fisherman's Daughter, under the pseudonym Molly Jackson.

In addition to his writing Ryan has contributed to several television series and video games. In 2002 Ryan co-created and appeared in ITV's action series, Ultimate Force, playing the role of Blue Troop leader Staff Sergeant Johnny Bell in the first series. He acted as a military adviser for the video game I.G.I.-2: Covert Strike.

Ryan was the star of BBC One's Hunting Chris Ryan in 2003 which later aired on the Military Channel as Special Forces Manhunt. In 2004 Ryan produced several programmes titled Terror Alert: Could You Survive, demonstrating how to survive disasters including flooding, nuclear terrorist attack, mass blackouts, and plane hijackings. In 2005, Ryan presented a Sky One show called How Not to Die, detailing how to survive various life-threatening situations. In 2007 Ryan trained and managed a six-man team to represent Team GB at Sure for Men's Extreme Pamplona Chase in Spain during the Running of the Bulls and also appeared in an episode of the Derren Brown series, Mind Control with Derren Brown, where he booby-trapped a course for Brown to follow whilst blindfolded. Ryan presented the television series Elite World Cops, also broadcast as Armed and Dangerous, which aired on Bravo in 2008. In the show, Ryan spends time with law enforcement agencies around the world.

== Personal life ==
Ryan has one daughter.

His experiences in Iraq caused him to suffer from post traumatic stress disorder. Also, following his consumption of radioactive water during his Bravo Two Zero escape he was warned not to have any children in the future.

== Books ==
Ryan has written the following books:

=== Non-fiction ===
- The One That Got Away (1995)
- Chris Ryan's SAS Fitness Book (1999)
- Chris Ryan's Ultimate Survival Guide (2003)
- Fight to Win: Deadly Skills of the Elite Forces (2009)
- Safe: How To Stay Safe in a Dangerous World (2017)
- The History of the SAS (2019)

=== Fiction ===
Agent 21

- Agent 21 (2010)
- Reloaded (2012)
- Codebreaker (2013)
- Deadfall (2014)
- Under Cover (2015)
- Endgame (2016)

Alpha Force

- Survival (2002)
- Rat-catcher (2002)
- Desert Pursuit (2003)
- Hostage (2003)
- Red Centre (2004)
- Hunted (2004)
- Blood Money (2005)
- Fault Line (2005)
- Black Gold (2005)
- Untouchable (2005)

Code Red

- Flash Flood (2006)
- Wildfire (2007)
- Outbreak (2007)
- Vortex (2008)
- Twister (2008)
- Battleground (2009)

Danny Black

- Masters of War (2013)
- Hunter Killer (2014)
- Hellfire (2015)
- Bad Soldier (2016)
- Warlord (2017)
- Head Hunters (2018)
- Black Ops (2019)
- Zero 22 (2020)

David Hawkins

- Second Strike (2025)
- Breakout (forthcoming 2026)

Extreme

- Hard Target (2012)
- Night Strike (2013)
- Most Wanted (2014)
- Silent Kill (2015)

Geordie Sharp

- Stand By, Stand By (1996)
- Zero Option (1997)
- The Kremlin Device (1998)
- Tenth Man Down (1999)

Jamie Carter

- Outcast (2022)
- Cold Red (2023)
- Traitor (2024)

Matt Browning

- Greed (2003)
- The Increment (2004)

Special Forces Cadets

- Siege (2018)
- Missing (2019)
- Justice (2019)
- Ruthless (2020)
- Hijack (2020)
- Assassin (2021)

Strike Back

- Strike Back (2007)

The series are sequels to the novel "Strike Back" (2007) as the events of "Strike Back" (2007) are referenced in all of them.

- Deathlist (2016)
- Shadow Kill (2017)
- Global Strike (2018)
- Red Strike (2019)
- Circle of Death (2020)

Quick Reads

- One Good Turn (2008)

Other

- The Hit List (2000)
- The Watchman (2001)
- Land of Fire (2002)
- Blackout (2005)
- Ultimate Weapon (2006)
- Firefight (2008)
- The Fisherman's Daughter (2009) (as Molly Jackson)
- Who Dares Wins (2009)
- The Kill Zone (2010)
- Medal of Honor (2010)
- Killing for the Company (2011)
- Osama (2012)
- Manhunter (2021)

== Filmography ==
- Ultimate Force (2002) - SSgt Johnny Bell
- Hunting Chris Ryan (2003) - Himself
- Elite World Cops (2008) - Himself
- Chris Ryan's Strike Back (2010) - Commanding Officer
