= Hunting Chris Ryan =

- Starring: Chris Ryan
- Country of origin: United Kingdom
- No. of episodes: 3

Production
- Production company: BBC

Original release
- Release: 2003

Hunting Chris Ryan is a documentary produced by the BBC in 2003. It comprised three hour-long episodes, each pitting SAS veteran Chris Ryan against a four-man "Hunter Force" whilst he completed a set objective, his mission being evasion and ultimately extraction once the objective was complete. The series was re-released in the United States as Special Forces: Manhunt, broadcast on Discovery's The Military Channel.

== The Hunter Force ==
The four men trailing Ryan are an elite squad of soldiers, they were given as the following;

- C/Sgt Ken Waterhouse – Retired Royal Marines Colour Sergeant and weapons expert
- Cpl Simon Harris – Retired Pathfinder Platoon Team Commander and expert tracker
- SMCS Kenny Taylor – Retired United States Navy SEAL
- HMC Nick Teta – Retired United States Navy SEAL and counter-terrorist expert

== Episodes ==
Each of the missions was devised by Chris Plyming, a retired captain of the Parachute Regiment. Plyming serves as radio contact for both parties, giving instructions and objectives to Chris Ryan and the Hunter Force.

Locale	Location	Mission	Status
Jungle	Mosquito Coast, Honduras	Retrieve classified Special Forces equipment buried in a cache.	Mission completed successfully
Arctic	Khatanga (Siberia), Russia	Locate a British spy satellite that has crashed 650 km (400 mi) inside the Arctic Circle and destroy any remains.	Mission failed. However, despite failing to locate or destroy the satellite, Ryan was able to successfully evade capture. He experienced life-threatening hypothermia.
Desert	Tsodilo Hills, Botswana	Rescue a fighter pilot shot down over the Kalahari Desert and escape using a microlight.	Mission failed.

== Notes ==
Ryan completed his first mission by running across a beach to his rendezvous point, a boat. The beach was patrolled both on land and sea by the Hunter Force but Ryan still escaped. Ryan used his only successful booby trap (a smoke grenade on a tripwire in front of the cache which the hunter force missed and set off).

During Ryan's second mission, he suffered from hypothermia whilst alone in the arctic wastelands. His failure to report his position or to make a contact with the film crew led to a search party being sent to Ryan's last known position. During a video recorded by Ryan himself from within his sleeping bag, he explained that his hands were too cold to operate either his radio or his stove. The search party eventually found him 3 kilometers from his rendezvous point and was treated that evening. The next day he returned to his position and continued with the mission. As in the first mission, Ryan made his escape with seconds to spare after two members of the hunter force arrive on Ski-doos as his helicopter takes off.

In the final mission, the Hunter Force gathered extra help from a unit of a local militia, as well as numerous vehicles including jeeps, quad bikes, boats and a helicopter. These reinforcements played a significant part in Ryan's failure of the mission as the increased enemy numbers around the downed pilot forced him to abort his mission, and the helicopter surveillance informed the Hunter Force on the location of the microlight escape. Ryan also stole a horse from a rancher during night fall to get ahead of the Hunter Force, a piece of information they may not have understood or even received without the militia present. Ryan did get the microlight into the air but is "shot down" by Taylor.
