= Casca (series) =

Historical fantasy novel series by Barry Sadler

- Cover of The Eternal Mercenary
- Author: Barry Sadler; Paul Dengelegi; Tony Roberts; John L. Thompson (co-author)
- Language: English
- Genre: Historical fiction Military fiction Fantasy
- No. of books: 65
- Website: https://casca.net/

Casca is a series of historical fantasy novels created by American author Barry Sadler in 1979. The series follows Casca Rufio Longinus, a Roman legionary who pierces the side of Jesus during the Crucifixion and is cursed with immortality, condemned to wander through history as a soldier until the Second Coming. The character draws upon traditions associated with Longinus and the Wandering Jew.

Sadler wrote the original novels in the series until his death in 1989, with The Mongol published posthumously in 1990. Following Sadler's death, the series was continued under his estate through other writers. Paul Dengelegi wrote The Liberator (1999) and The Defiant (2001), and Tony Roberts became the principal writer beginning with Halls of Montezuma (2006). In 2026, John L. Thompson joined Roberts as a co-writer, beginning with The Guardian, the 64th entry in the series, followed by The Seeker. Thompson has also served as the graphic designer for the series' book covers since 2015.

== Reception ==
Barry Sadler era

The Eternal Mercenary, the first novel in the series, achieved strong initial sales following its release in 1979. In August of that year, Radio & Records reported that the novel had reached sales of 100,000 copies after approximately one month in bookstores, while Sadler was making promotional appearances at bookstores in Nashville.

The novel subsequently received attention from science-fiction publications. In a 1981 review for Science Fiction Review, Mark Willard described The Eternal Mercenary as a reworking of the Wandering Jew legend and characterized it as a fast-paced historical war novel. The review also noted the novel's use of the Vietnam War as a modern-day framing narrative for Casca's account of his life following the Crucifixion. Although critical of the novel's limited ambitions, Willard found aspects of Casca's immortality intriguing and described Sadler's writing as competent.

Tony Roberts era

Several of Tony Roberts' later Casca novels have been reviewed by the military history website History of War. The Conqueror was described as "one of the better entries in the series", with the reviewer praising its focused plot and use of the historical setting. The site's review of The Anzac similarly praised Roberts' depiction of the Gallipoli campaign and noted the series' ability to connect widely separated historical periods through the same central character.

== Characters ==
=== Casca Rufio Longinus ===
Map of Etruria during the Roman period. In the Casca series, Casca grows up in a village in the Tuscan hills.

Casca Rufio Longinus is a Roman soldier who, according to the series chronology, was born around AD 2 in the village of Falerno in the Tuscan hills. After his family dies during a pestilence, he enlists in the 7th Legion at Livorno around AD 21. He later serves with the 10th Legion and, by AD 33, is stationed in Jerusalem, where he is assigned to the execution of Jesus of Nazareth.

At Golgotha, Casca pierces Jesus with his spear in an attempt to end his suffering. Jesus condemns Casca to remain as he is until they meet again, leaving Casca unable to die or permanently age. This event establishes the central premise of the series, with Casca condemned to wander through history as an immortal soldier.

Some time later, Casca discovers the nature of his immortality after being stabbed during an altercation with a superior officer. Although he continues to experience pain and can be wounded and scarred, his injuries heal and he does not age. He is eventually expelled from the legion and condemned to slavery in the mines.

After years in the mines, Casca is sold as a gladiator. Concealing his ability to recover from otherwise serious wounds, he rises through the gladiatorial ranks and eventually gains his freedom. His subsequent adventures carry him through successive periods of history, with Casca repeatedly serving as a soldier or mercenary while attempting to conceal his immortality.

Throughout the series, Casca's immortality allows him to participate in wars and other historical events spanning nearly two thousand years. His adventures place him in conflicts ranging from the ancient and medieval worlds to the American Revolution, World War I, World War II and the Vietnam War. A 2023 feature published by Arizona State University noted the series' use of historical settings and figures, including Casca's encounters with Genghis Khan and Attila the Hun.

Throughout his travels, Casca encounters numerous other historical figures, including Marco Polo, Hernán Cortés, Blackbeard, George Washington, Robert E. Lee and Adolf Hitler. These encounters form a recurring element of the series, placing the fictional immortal soldier within historical events across successive periods of history.

=== Julius Goldman ===
Julius Goldman is a United States Army surgeon who serves with the rank of major at the 8th Field Hospital in Nha Trang during the Vietnam War. In The Eternal Mercenary, Goldman treats a severely wounded American soldier known as Casey Romain, whose otherwise fatal injuries begin healing at an extraordinary rate. Goldman eventually discovers that Romain is Casca Rufio Longinus and becomes one of the few people in the modern era to know the truth of Casca's immortality.

Goldman subsequently becomes Casca's confidant and chronicler, recording the stories Casca relates about his experiences throughout history. Later novels periodically return to Goldman as a framing device through which Casca's past adventures are introduced. In The Persian, Goldman and his former Army colleague Robert Landries recall treating Casca in Vietnam, and Goldman shares another manuscript recounting Casca's past with Landries.

As Goldman grows older, the role of chronicling Casca's experiences begins to pass to a younger generation. Danny Landries, the son of Goldman's former Army colleague Robert Landries, is introduced to Casca in Devil's Horseman and subsequently assumes a similar role as a confidant and chronicler.

=== The Brotherhood of the Lamb ===
The Brotherhood of the Lamb is a recurring militant religious sect and one of Casca's principal enemies throughout the series. The organization is led by an Elder and an Inner Circle consisting of the Elder and twelve chosen members. The Brotherhood possesses the Spear of Longinus, the weapon Casca used at the Crucifixion, which it regards as its holiest relic. The Brotherhood's importance to the series was also noted in a 2012 announcement for a proposed television adaptation of Casca, which described the centuries-long conflict between Casca and the organization as a central element of the story.

According to the series, the Brotherhood was founded by Izram, who calls himself the Thirteenth Disciple after witnessing Casca pierce Jesus during the Crucifixion. Izram acquires Casca's spear and concludes that because Jesus told Casca they would meet again, Casca must remain alive until the Second Coming. The Brotherhood therefore follows Casca throughout history, regarding him as an enemy for his role in the Crucifixion while also believing that he must survive until Christ returns.

The Brotherhood periodically reenacts the Crucifixion as part of its religious rituals, using the Spear of Longinus. Its encounters with Casca frequently become violent. In The Warlord, Elder Dacort severs Casca's hand after Casca touches the spear; in The Persian, the acolyte Rasheed attempts to have Casca burned at the stake; and in The Sentinel, Elder Gregory murders Casca's adopted son Demos and his companion Ireina. Casca is also held prisoner by the Brotherhood in Panzer Soldier and The Cursed.

Leadership of the Brotherhood changes throughout the centuries, allowing the organization to recur in widely separated historical periods. Known Elders depicted in the series include Dacort, Imhept, Gregory, Father Mulcahy, Thassus and Janus. The series also depicts the historical figure Heinrich Himmler as an Elder of the Brotherhood in Panzer Soldier.

== Publication history ==
The Casca novels are not published in the chronological order of Casca's life. The stories move between widely separated historical periods, with later novels sometimes serving as sequels or prequels to earlier entries.

Publication history of Casca
Title	Book No.	Summary	Author	Release year	Notes
Summary	Author	Release year	Notes		
The Eternal Mercenary	1	During the Vietnam War, U.S. Army Major Dr. Julius Goldman discovers that wounded soldier "Casey Romain" is actually Casca Rufio Longinus, a 2,000-year-old Roman legionnaire cursed with immortality by Jesus Christ.	Barry Sadler	1979	~33 AD
God of Death	2	In 3rd century Mexico, Casca is declared a god by the Teotec Indians, and he defends them from an attack by the Olmecs.	Barry Sadler	1979	~252 AD
The War Lord	3	Casca travels to 3rd century Byzantium and China, where he is buried alive by a jealous empress.	Barry Sadler	1980	~268 AD
Panzer Soldier	4	Casca fights for the Germans at the Battle of Kursk, and later meets Adolf Hitler.	Barry Sadler	1980	~1943 AD
The Barbarian	5	Casca deserts the Roman legion in the 2nd century and joins a Germanic tribe.	Barry Sadler	1981	~165 AD
The Persian	6	Casca becomes a commander in the army of Persian king Shapur II, but is burned at the stake when he is branded a heretic.	Barry Sadler	1982	~328 AD
The Damned	7	Casca returns to the Roman Empire in time to see Rome fall to the Visigoths, then joins the fight against Atilla the Hun at the Battle of the Catalunian Plains in 451.	Barry Sadler	1982	~400 AD
Soldier of Fortune	8	Casca serves as a Cambodian mercenary in 1976.	Barry Sadler	1983	~1973 AD
The Sentinel	9	After sleeping in an ice cave for more than a century, Casca travels to the Eastern Roman Empire to fight against the Vandals in 534.	Barry Sadler	1983	~453 AD
The Conquistador	10	Casca escapes from a 16th-century Spanish prison and travels to the New World with Hernán Cortés.	Barry Sadler	1984	~1485 AD
The Legionnaire	11	At the end of World War II, Casca is captured by the French and drafted into the French Foreign Legion. He is eventually sent to French Indochina, where he fights in the Battle of Dien Bien Phu.	Barry Sadler	1984	~1945 AD
African Mercenary	12	In 1977, Casca is sent on a mission to kill an African dictator, but is betrayed by his allies.	Barry Sadler	1984	~1977 AD
The Assassin	13	In the 11th century, Casca is captured by Arabic slave traders, and is inducted into the secret sect of the Hashshashin.	Barry Sadler	1985	~1090 AD
The Phoenix	14	Casca is captured by the People's Army of Vietnam while on a mission to stop a Viet Cong assassination squad. He escapes, but is mortally wounded while doing so, and is rushed to a U.S. Army field hospital. Prequel to The Eternal Mercenary, and thus the series as a whole.	Barry Sadler	1985	~1967 AD
The Pirate	15	In 1718, Casca sails to the Caribbean to escape arrest. There, he becomes involved with pirates, including the infamous Blackbeard.	Barry Sadler	1985	~1718 AD
Desert Mercenary	16	Casca and his friend Gus work as mercenaries during the Algerian War.	Barry Sadler	1986	~1956 AD
The Warrior	17	In the late 1860s, Casca sails the South Pacific, where he saves a small island village from a local warlord.	Barry Sadler	1987	~1866 AD
The Cursed	18	Casca joins the British Army in 1899, but deserts to the Chinese side and joins the Boxer Rebellion.	Barry Sadler	1987	~1899 AD
The Samurai	19	Casca is rescued off the coast of Japan in 1184, and later fights in the Battle of Dan-no-ura.	Barry Sadler	1988	~1184 AD
Soldier of Gideon	20	Casca joins the Israel Defense Forces and fights in the Golan Heights during the Six-Day War.	Barry Sadler	1988	~1967 AD
The Trench Soldier	21	Casca fights with the British Army during the early days of World War I.	Barry Sadler	1989	~1914 AD Last to be released by Barry Sadler before his death in 1989
The Mongol	22	Casca is rescued by a young Mongol warrior named Temujin. Casca teaches the young man the art of war, which allows him to conquer and unite the local tribes into a mighty army. Now calling himself Genghis Khan, Temujin sets his sights on the West.	Barry Sadler	1990	~1189 AD Written by Barry Sadler, released posthumously
The Liberator	23	When the ship carrying Casca is sunk, he spends six years at the bottom of the ocean until he is rescued by African fishermen. They worship him as a god, and ask him to free their people from the rule of an overlord who believes he is the Son of God.	Paul Dengelegi	1999	~1434 AD First to be written by Paul Dengelegi
The Defiant	24	Casca saves the life of a young Marco Polo and joins him on his journey to the court of Kublai Khan.	Paul Dengelegi	2001	~1270 AD Last to be written by Paul Dengelegi
Halls of Montezuma	25	Casca arrives in the United States in the 1840s. He joins the U.S. Army during the Mexican–American War and takes part in the Battle of Chapultepec.	Tony Roberts	2006	~1846 AD First to be written by Tony Roberts
Johnny Reb	26	Casca fights for the Confederate States of America during the American Civil War.	Tony Roberts	2007	~1861 AD
The Confederate	27	During the American Civil War, Casca must face threats both from the North and the Brotherhood.	Tony Roberts	2008	~1863 AD
The Avenger	28	Casca returns to the Eastern Roman Empire in the 6th century to get revenge against the Brotherhood, and takes part in the Battle of Taginae.	Tony Roberts	2008	~535 AD
Immortal Dragon	29	Not Applicable	Michael B. Goodwin	2008	Removed from the series over allegations of plagiarizing the novel Rambo 3 by David Morrell (writer)
Napoleon's Soldier	30	Casca joins Napoleon's Grande Armée and participates in the 1812 French invasion of Russia.	Tony Roberts	2009	~1812 AD
The Conqueror	31	Casca enlists in the army of William I and takes part in the Battle of Hastings.	Tony Roberts	2009	~1066 AD
The Anzac	32	On the run from British authorities after two British soldiers are accidentally killed (having discovered Casca's immortality while he was in a hospital), Casca fights for the Australian and New Zealand Army Corps in the Gallipoli campaign of World War I.	Tony Roberts	2010	~1915 AD
The Outlaw	33	Not Applicable	Michael B. Goodwin	2010	Removed from the series over allegations of plagiarizing the novel The Trespassers by Andrew J. Fenady
Devil's Horseman	34	During the Mongol invasion of Europe, Casca is dragged into factional struggles, and takes part in the Battle of Mohi.	Tony Roberts	2010	~1236 AD
Sword of the Brotherhood	35	Casca is blackmailed into helping the Brotherhood retrieve the Holy Lance from the Sasanian Empire during the Byzantine–Sasanian War of 602–628.	Tony Roberts	2011	~622 AD
The Minuteman	36	During the American Revolutionary War, Casca finds a tough adversary in British Major Sir Richard Eley as he fights at the Battle of Bunker Hill, the Battle of White Plains, the Battle of Trenton, and Battle of Princeton.	Tony Roberts	2011	~1775 AD
Roman Mercenary	37	Casca and a team of six mercenaries set out to rescue a rich man's daughter from Rome, which is being occupied by the Visigoths.	Tony Roberts	2012	~410 AD
The Continental	38	Casca is captured during the Philadelphia campaign and is held on a British prison hulk off the coast of New York City. He eventually escapes and fights Major Sir Richard Eley one last time at the Battle of Guilford Court House.	Tony Roberts	2012	~1777 AD
The Crusader	39	Casca works for Byzantine Emperor Alexios I Komnenos during the First Crusade and helps a Frankish noblewoman on her journey towards Jerusalem.	Tony Roberts	2013	~1096 AD
Blitzkreig	40	During World War II, Casca joins the Wehrmacht's panzer corps and fights in Poland, Belgium, and France, while trying to avoid a police hunt after a murder in a Berlin hotel that Casca was involved in.	Tony Roberts	2013	~1939 AD
The Longbowman	41	Casca joins the army of Henry V and takes part in the Battle of Agincourt.	Tony Roberts	2014	~1415 AD
Barbarossa	42	Casca continues to fight for the Wehrmacht panzer corps as they invade the Soviet Union, covering the Eastern Front campaigns of 1941 and 1942.	Tony Roberts	2015	~1941 AD
Scourge of Asia	43	Casca is recruited by the Byzantine emperor to find a warlord to destroy the Ottomans. Casca's travels take him to Transoxiana, where he meets the rising Timur.	Tony Roberts	2015	~1363 AD
Balkan Mercenary	44	During the Croatian War of Independence, Casca is hired by Croatia to assemble a team of mercenaries to infiltrate Serbian territory and take out an ethnic-cleansing warlord.	Tony Roberts	2016	~1991 AD
Emperor's Mercenary	45	Casca and a colleague are sent into war-torn Gaul to save a valuable artifact from being destroyed before the fall of the besieged city of Arelate.	Tony Roberts	2016	~411 AD
The Cavalryman	46	Casca hunts down a man who attacked a prostitute, leading him to join the 7th Cavalry Regiment immediately prior to the Battle of the Little Bighorn.	Tony Roberts	2017	~1870 AD
The Viking	47	Casca heads to Scandinavia to get away from the growing might of Charlemagne and becomes involved in Viking politics and war.	Tony Roberts	2018	~797 AD
The Austrian	48	Casca, intent on settling a score with the Ottomans, defends the Imperial Austrian city of Vienna against the Ottoman Empire during the Battle of Vienna.	Tony Roberts	2018	~1683 AD
The Lombard	49	Casca joins a tribe of Lombards and lives amongst them for years until news of Narses, his former enemy, arrives. Casca decides Narses must finally be brought to justice.	Tony Roberts	2018	~552 AD
The Commissar	50	Casca joins the Red Army during the Soviet–Ukrainian War, but soon turns on them after learning of their brutality.	Tony Roberts	2019	~1917 AD
The Saracen	51	Casca returns to the Holy Land and, after falling foul of Raynald of Châtillon, joins the army of Saladin and takes part in the decisive Battle of Hattin.	Tony Roberts	2019	~1187 AD
The Rough Rider	52	When the Spanish–American War breaks out in 1898, Casca joins the U.S. Army and is sent to Cuba to fight in Theodore Roosevelt's unit, the "Rough Riders", in the Battle of San Juan Hill.	Tony Roberts	2020	~1898 AD
The Last Defender	53	Casca fights the Ottomans to defend the city of Constantinople, the last vestige of his native Roman Empire.	Tony Roberts	2020	~1453 AD
The Killer	54	Casca returns from the horrors of Indo-China in 1954 to Algeria with the French Foreign Legion, and takes part in the Algerian War of Independence.	Tony Roberts	2021	~1954 AD
The Moor	55	Uncovered by a sandstorm, Casca wanders the Sahara until he ends up in Tangier and joins the army of the Moors to invade Spain in the 8th century, taking part in the Battle of Guadalete. Later he falls foul of the Arabs and ends up in the Frankish Kingdom where Charles Martel leads his forces against the Arabs in the Battle of Tours.	Tony Roberts	2021	~711 AD
The Iron Duke's Man	56	Casca fights against Napoleon at the Battle of Waterloo.	Tony Roberts	2022	~1815 AD
The Red Rose	57	Casca becomes involved in the Wars of the Roses after unexpectedly helping an English noblewoman outside Calais.	Tony Roberts	2022	1454-1461 AD
The Hunter	58	Taking a contract to stop the Brotherhood of the Lamb from obtaining a top-secret weapon abandoned in Chernobyl in 1986, Casca becomes involved in the Russian invasion of Ukraine.	Tony Roberts	2023	2022 AD
The Explorer	59	Casca’s wanderlust takes him to the capital of the Chalukyan Kingdom where he finds himself involved in the war against the rival kingdom of Pullava.	Tony Roberts	2023	~620 AD
The Prussian	60	Hunted by French soldiers, Casca joins the army of Frederick the Great.	Tony Roberts	2024	~1757 AD
The Scot	61	Casca is drawn into war with Scottish rebel William Wallace, fighting with him against the English forces of King Edward Longshanks.	Tony Roberts	2024	~1300 AD
The Nationalist	62	The Spanish Civil War forms the background to this tale in which the immortal warrior fights.	Tony Roberts	2025	~1936 AD
The Bulgar Slayer	63	Casca fights for the Eastern Roman Empire in a long war against the Bulgars.	Tony Roberts	2025	~1014
The Guardian	64	In New Mexico, Casca reunites with old allies and is drawn into a new conflict where his centuries of experience may be the difference between life and death.	Tony Roberts, John L. Thompson	2026	~2024
The Seeker	65	In the Crusader States, Casca joins a band of mercenaries hired to rescue a Jewish merchant’s kidnapped daughter, but soon discovers that a killer may be hiding among his companions.	Tony Roberts, John L. Thompson	2026	~1360

=== Other countries and languages ===
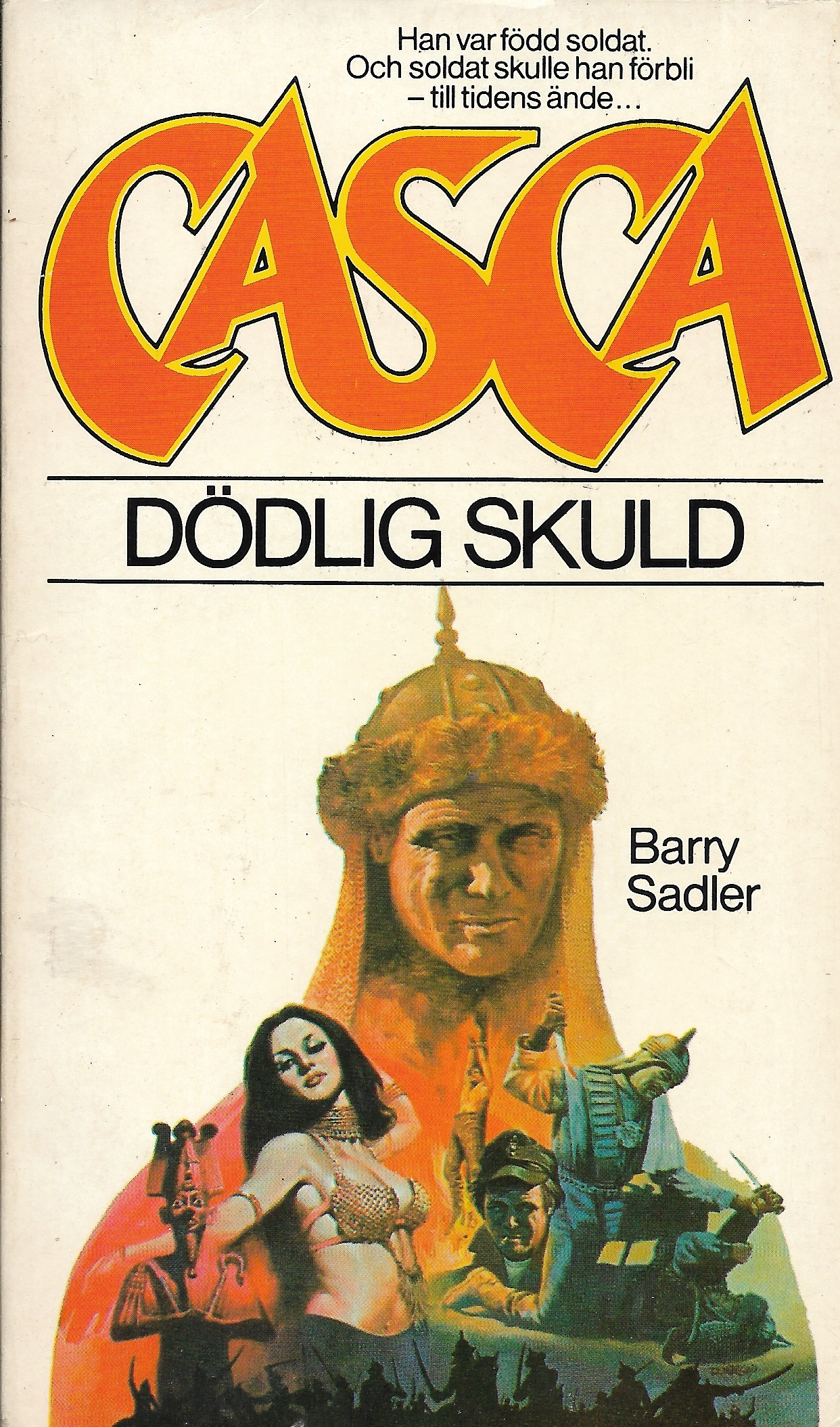
Swedish version of Casca the Persian

UK

Star Books published British paperback editions of several early Casca novels during the mid-1980s. The Eternal Mercenary and God of Death were published by Star in 1984, followed by The War Lord in 1985.

Sweden

The Casca series was translated into Swedish, with several of Barry Sadler's novels published by Populär-pocket during the 1980s. Swedish editions included translations of The Damned, The African Mercenary, The Legionnaire, The Assassin, The Persian, The Barbarian, The Sentinel and The Conquistador.

B. Wahlströms later reissued the series in Swedish hardcover omnibus editions during the 1990s.

Japan

The Eternal Mercenary was translated into Japanese as Eien no Yōhei (『永遠の傭兵』) by Yukiko Andō (安藤由紀子) and published by Tokyo Sogensha in January 1988 as part of the Sogen Mystery Bunko series (no. 239-1). The edition was published under ISBN 4-488-23901-3.

=== Audiobook ===
Audio editions of a number of novels in the Casca series have been released by several publishers. Books in Motion produced unabridged audiobook editions of the series, with Gene Engene narrating many of Barry Sadler's original novels. Books in Motion editions have been distributed in both physical and digital formats.

Earlier abridged audio editions of some titles were also released by Americana Publishing. Books in Motion later issued unabridged editions of titles in the series and continues to distribute Casca audiobooks digitally.

=== E-books ===
In January 2014, the series was put into e-book format, and all existing books in the series up to 2014 (with the exception of The Liberator, The Defiant, Immortal Dragon and The Outlaw) were available in Kindle format by June that same year.

As of 2025, all Tony Roberts editions are available on Kobo eBooks.

== Controversy ==
As is the case with some serialized series of books, there are often controversies associated with certain titles. The Casca series was not immune from such controversies.

Ghostwriters

For years following Sadler’s death in 1989, allegations of ghostwriters having written some, if not all, of the Casca series have circulated within many fan circles. The theory has been put forth that Charter Ace originally intended to use Sadler’s fame as a house name for the Casca series. Many fans and literary aficionados often mention Kenneth Bulmer, a prolific science fiction author, as one author who may have penned Panzer Soldier and Mongol, according to his book biography list. Although mentioned in Bulmer's online biography, there is no evidence to support this claim.

Currently, no evidence has come to light to deny or confirm the use of ghostwriters within the Casca series.

Unauthorized Editions

In 2004, without permission from the Sadler estate, former Casca author Paul Dengelegi wrote an unauthorized non-canonical story titled Casca: The Outcast.

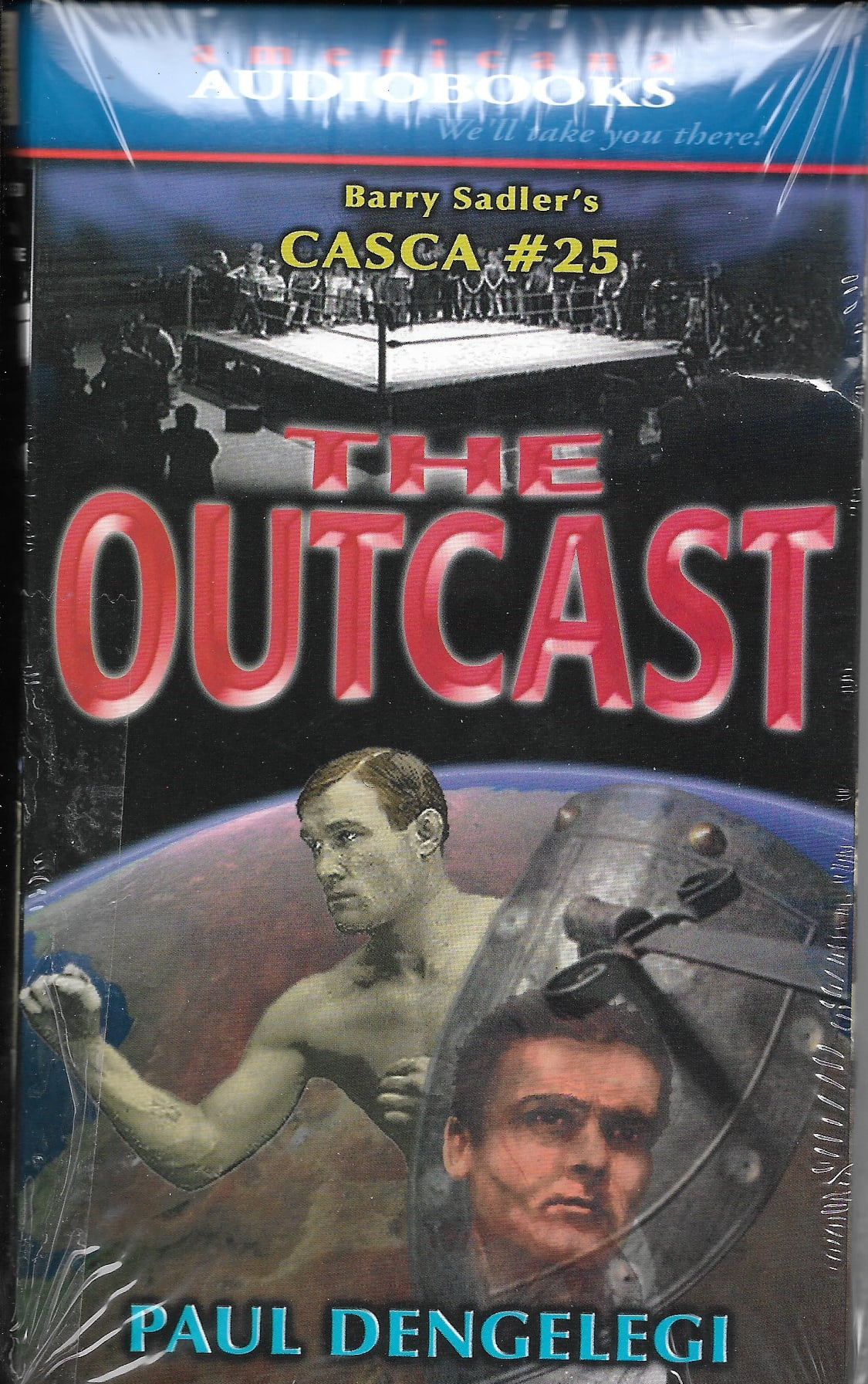

The story follows Casca as a prizefighter in Victorian era England with acquaintances Ike and Ulysses. After an encounter with police and a slave trader selling a female slave to a wealthy man, Casca is shot, impaled on a bayonet, and placed on a prison hulk where fights are staged between prisoners (including Ike and Ulysses, led by Scottish prisoner Simon) for the vessel's captain. Eventually, Ulysses kills the captain and orders the female slave to be freed. The prison hulk arrives in Tasmania, where Casca becomes famous as Australia's champion prizefighter. While on a ship to the United States, the ship Casca and his acquaintances are on is attacked by Royal Marines who mistake their ship for pirates, and Ike is killed while Casca is mortally wounded. The story ends with Ulysses substituting Casca's coffin for one full of rocks and hiding Casca's body from the burial party.

Dengelegi contracted with Americana Audio to have it published as a three-disc audiobook CD and an abridged version presented in a two-cassette tape set. This was subsequently withdrawn in 2006 following the closure of Americana Audio.

Plagiarism

Michael B. Goodwin wrote two entries in the Casca series, Immortal Dragon (2008) and The Outlaw (2010). Both books were subsequently withdrawn from the series following allegations of plagiarism. Immortal Dragon was alleged to contain material derived from David Morrell's novelization of Rambo III, while The Outlaw was alleged to contain material derived from Andrew J. Fenady's western novel The Trespassers.

The controversy was the subject of a 2020 episode of the Paperback Warrior podcast examining the history of the Casca series and the plagiarism allegations surrounding the two books.

== See also ==
- Wandering Jew
- Saint Longinus the Centurion
- Barry Sadler
