= List of films and TV series set in the 1920s =

The 1920s have been a popular decade for nostalgic Hollywood films. The following is a list of films and TV series set in the 1920s.

== 1930s ==
- Alexander's Ragtime Band (1938)
- Angels with Dirty Faces (1938)
- The Bitter Tea of General Yen (1933)
- The Blue Angel (1930)
- Boys Town (1938)
- The Great Ziegfeld (1936)
- I Am a Fugitive from a Chain Gang (1932)
- The Informer (1935)
- It Happened in Hollywood (1937)
- The Key (1934)
- Manhattan Melodrama (1934)
- The Mummy (1932)
- Mystery of the Wax Museum (1933)
- The Public Enemy (1931)
- The Road Back (1937)
- The Roaring Twenties (1939)
- Scarface (1932)
- Show Boat (1936)
- Vanity Fair (1932)
- Viva Villa! (1934)

== 1940s ==
- Citizen Kane (1941)
- Edison the Man (1940)
- Happy Land (1943)
- Heaven Can Wait (1943)
- The Great Gatsby (1949)
- It's a Wonderful Life (1946)
- The Jolson Story (1946)
- The Keys of the Kingdom (1944)
- The Life and Death of Colonel Blimp (1943)
- Old Acquaintance (1943)
- One Foot in Heaven (1941)
- The Pride of the Yankees (1942)
- Random Harvest (1942)
- The Razor's Edge (1946)
- Roxie Hart (1942)
- The Sin of Harold Diddlebock (1947)
- The Strange Love of Martha Ivers (1946)
- The Treasure of the Sierra Madre (1948)
- Wilson (1944)
- Yankee Doodle Dandy (1942)

== 1950s ==
- Anastasia (1956)
- Auntie Mame (1958)
- Beau James (1957)
- The Buster Keaton Story (1957)
- Cheaper by the Dozen (1950)
- The Court-Martial of Billy Mitchell (1955)
- Giant (1956)
- The Glenn Miller Story (1954)
- Has Anybody Seen My Gal (1952)
- Houdini (1953)
- Jeanne Eagels (1957)
- Man of a Thousand Faces (1957)
- The Quiet Man (1952)
- The Rising of the Moon (1957)
- Shake Hands with the Devil (1959)
- Show Boat (1951)
- Singin' in the Rain (1952)
- Some Like It Hot (1959)
- The Spirit of St. Louis (1957)
- The Story of Will Rogers (1952)
- Valentino (1951)
- The Wings of Eagles (1957)

== 1960s ==
- The Big Bankroll (1961)
- The Blood of Fu Manchu (1968)
- The Carpetbaggers (1964)
- The Castle of Fu Manchu (1969)
- Doctor Zhivago (1965)
- Elmer Gantry (1960)
- The Face of Fu Manchu (1965)
- Funny Girl (1968)
- Gigot (1962)
- Hush… Hush, Sweet Charlotte (1964)
- Inherit the Wind (1960)
- Robin and the 7 Hoods (1964)
- The Sand Pebbles (1966)
- Splendor in the Grass (1961)
- Sunrise at Campobello (1960)
- Tender is the Night (1962)
- Thoroughly Modern Millie (1967)
- The Vengeance of Fu Manchu (1967)
- The Yellow Rolls-Royce (1964)

== 1970s ==
- 1900 (1976)
- The Boy Friend (1971)
- Caddie (1976)
- F for Fake (1974)
- The Front Page (1974)
- The Godfather Part II (1974)
- The Great Gatsby (1974)
- The Great Waldo Pepper (1975)
- The Moonstone (1972)
- Lady Sings the Blues (1972)
- One of Our Dinosaurs Is Missing (1975)
- The Private Files of J. Edgar Hoover (1977)
- The Twelve Chairs (1970)
- Upstairs, Downstairs (1971–1975)
- Valentino (1977)
- W.C. Fields and Me (1976)
- The World's Greatest Lover (1977)

== 1980s ==
- Agatha Christie's Poirot (1989–2013)
- American Pop (1981)
- Before Stonewall (1984)
- Bloodhounds of Broadway (1989)
- Brideshead Revisited (1981 TV serial)
- Chariots of Fire (1981)
- Chiefs (miniseries, 1983)
- The Color Purple (1985)
- Divinas palabras (1987)
- Doctor Faustus (1982)
- Gandhi (1982)
- The Last Emperor (1987)
- Matewan (1987)
- A Month in the Country (1987)
- Mussolini: The Untold Story (1985)
- The Natural (1984)
- Once Upon a Time in America (1984)
- Out of Africa (1985)
- A Passage to India (1984)
- Sahara (1983)
- Something Wicked This Way Comes (1983)
- Sunset (1988)
- The Untouchables (1987)
- Wait Until Spring, Bandini (1989)
- Winston Churchill: The Wilderness Years (1981 TV serial)
- The Woman in Black (1989)
- Zelig (1983)

== 1990s ==
- The Babe (1992)
- Balto (1995)
- Bullets Over Broadway (1994)
- Chaplin (1992)
- A Chef in Love (1996)
- The Cider House Rules (1999)
- Enchanted April (1992)
- Evita (1996)
- Fried Green Tomatoes (1991)
- Haunted (1995)
- The House of Eliott (1991–1994)
- The Legend of 1900 (1998)
- Legends of the Fall (1994)
- The Lover (1992)
- Malcolm X (1992)
- Michael Collins (1996)
- Miller's Crossing (1990)
- Mrs. Parker and the Vicious Circle (1994)
- Nixon (1995)
- No Greater Love (1996)
- Porco Rosso (1992)
- RKO 281 (1999)
- Stalin (1992)
- Sweet and Lowdown (1999)
- Timecop (1994)
- The Wooden Man's Bride (1994)

== 2000s ==
- Admiral (2008)
- Agatha Christie's Marple (2004–2013)
- Al sur de Granada (2003)
- Amelia (2009)
- Anarchists (2000)
- The Aviator (2004)
- Balto II: Wolf Quest (2002)
- Balto III: Wings of Change (2004)
- Brideshead Revisited (2008 film)
- Bright Young Things (2003)
- The Cat's Meow (2001)
- Century Hotel (2001)
- Changeling (2008)
- Chicago (2002)
- Cinderella Man (2005)
- Coco Before Chanel (2009)
- Coco Chanel & Igor Stravinsky (2009)
- The Curious Case of Benjamin Button (2008)
- The Fall (2006)
- Frida (2002)
- Fullmetal Alchemist the Movie: Conqueror of Shamballa (2005)
- A Good Woman (2004)
- The Gray Man (2007)
- The Great Gatsby (2000)
- Head in the Clouds (2004)
- Hitler: The Rise of Evil (2003)
- The Hours (2002)
- Leatherheads (2008)
- Letters from Iwo Jima (2006)
- Life with Judy Garland: Me and My Shadows (2001)
- Max (2002)
- Memoirs of a Geisha (2005)
- Monster House (2006)
- The Princess and the Frog (2009)
- Sands of Oblivion (2007)
- Seabiscuit (2003)
- There Will Be Blood (2007)
- The Tracker (2002)
- Two Brothers (2004)
- La Vie en rose (2007)
- Warm Springs (2005)
- The Wind That Shakes the Barley (2006)

== 2010s ==
- Babylon Berlin (2017–)
- Boardwalk Empire (2010–2014)
- Cable Girls (2017-)
- The Crimes of Grindelwald (2018)
- The Danish Girl (2015)
- Derrière les murs (2011)
- Downton Abbey (series, 2010–2015)
- Downton Abbey (film, 2019)
- Fantastic Beasts and Where to Find Them (2016)
- The Great Gatsby (2013)
- The King's Speech (2010)
- Let the Bullets Fly (2010)
- The Lost City of Z (2016)
- Magic in the Moonlight (2014)
- Midnight in Paris (2011)
- Miss Fisher's Murder Mysteries (2012–2015)
- The Nutcracker in 3D (2010)
- Panzram (2011)
- Peaky Blinders (2013-)

== 2020s ==
- Ma Rainey's Black Bottom (2020)
- Babylon (2022)
