= Soldier Five =

Book on The Bravo Two Zero mission

- Author: Mike Coburn
- Language: English
- Genre: Special Forces / Gulf War
- Publisher: Random House
- Publication date: October 2004
- Publication place: United Kingdom
- Media type: Print (Hardcover & Paperback)
- Pages: 316
- ISBN: 1-84018-907-X
- OCLC: 57527981

Soldier Five – The Real Truth About the Bravo Two Zero Mission is the third book about the Bravo Two Zero mission during the Gulf War to have been written by a member of the eight-man patrol involved.

It is published under the pseudonym "Mike Coburn", but the author is the member referred to as "Mark the Kiwi" in other accounts.

It is more critical of the command structure than other accounts had been and the book was only published after a lengthy and expensive series of court battles, and by court order the resulting royalties go to the UK Ministry of Defence.

== Plot ==
Originally a member of the New Zealand SAS, after traveling to England and passing SAS selection in the winter of 1990, "Mike Coburn" is assigned to A Squadron of 22nd Special Air Service Regiment and begins training on desert vehicle tactics in preparation for insertion behind Iraqi enemy lines in the Gulf War. However, on arrival at the United Arab Emirates regimental mounting base Coburn and fellow A Squadron member Sergeant Vincent Phillips are transferred to B Squadron, who are understrength after committing men to an in-theater hostage rescue team. After being tasked with a special reconnaissance mission behind enemy lines in the Anbar Province of western Iraq, the eight-man patrol (commanded by Sergeant "Andy McNab") are instructed by the Commanding Officer of B Squadron to E&E into Syria if they get cut off from headquarters, and that the CIA had prepared safe houses across the border where they could find shelter. They are also instructed that in the event of capture they are to claim they are part of a combat Search and Rescue team looking for downed pilots. The patrol is informed the mission's primary goal is to locate and then call in airstrikes on Scud missile launchers, with a secondary objective of sabotaging Iraqi military fiber optic cables.

After being dropped off by Chinook helicopter approximately 30 kilometres to the west of Haditha, the patrol move their supplies into a dried up river bed just before dawn to wait until the following night before patrolling the surrounding area, however the next morning they observe S60 triple A anti-aircraft guns along with troops about 800 meters to the north of their position. The patrol also discover their PRC-319 military radio isn't working, and decide to return to their drop off point for emergency pick up that night as per their lost comms procedure. However, they are discovered by a shepherd an hour before sundown and are fired on by Iraqi troops and an armoured personnel carrier from distance as they escape the wadi system. The patrol return suppressive fire from their Minimis and M16/M203s, and abandon their supplies of food, water, and ammunition, retreating into the desert as darkness falls. When efforts to contact AWACS via emergency TACBE radios fail, the patrol head south towards their emergency RV in the hope search and rescue helicopters will pick up their signal.

After waiting for an hour at the emergency RV without contacting any helicopters, the patrol head north towards the Syrian border, where they witness several launches of Scud missiles in their immediate area. While exfiltrating north-west towards the border, the patrol gets split into two groups while McNab attempts to contact an overhead Coalition fighter jet using a TACBE communicator. The patrol continues towards the border, hiding during the day and moving only at night to avoid detection. With the cold weather worsening and his remaining patrol members starting to suffer from hypothermia, McNab decides to hijack a civilian vehicle to drive the remaining distance to the frontier before the next morning. The group are discovered at a vehicle security checkpoint close to the border and run off into the desert after a brief exchange of gunfire. Several more skirmishes occur between the patrol and Iraq military units around the outskirts of Al-Karābilah, before the patrol is split again after walking into an ambush by dug in Iraqi troops. Coburn and McNab run out of ammunition and dump their weapons in the Euphrates river, before attempting to crawl through a network of Iraqi fox holes undetected. After being fired upon again McNab escapes back towards the river while Coburn manages to crawl away without being spotted, before finally being captured Iraqi military an hour before dawn after being shot in the ankle.

Coburn is then taken to a local army camp, where he is interrogated and beaten, before being handed over to Iraqi military intelligence and moved to a military hospital on the outskirts of Baghdad for surgery on his gunshot wounds. Coburn tells his captors the pre-prepared cover story that he was part of a Combat Search and Rescue team who got stranded after their helicopter made an emergency landing, however the Iraq's allege he is part of the commando team who engaged in the earlier firefight against troops near Haditha. After weeks of mistreatment, the interrogators reveal that other members of the patrol have been captured and list off their names, as well as detailing how they were inserted by Chinook (which was heard by nearby Iraqi military personnel) on a mission to call in airstrikes on Scud launchers and sabotage Iraqi military fiber optic cables. Realizing the Iraqi's knew everything, Coburn admits to being a member of the SAS tasked with the mission they are describing. Coburn is then moved to a prison on the outskirts of Baghdad, and is eventually released soon after the end of the Gulf War.

Reuniting with the surviving patrol members in Cyprus after debriefing sessions at RAF Akrotiri, Coburn learns that Sergeant Vincent Phillips, Trooper Bob Consiglio and Trooper Steven Lane are all missing in action. While Corporal "Chris Ryan" managed to escape over the border to Syria, the remaining patrol members ("Andy McNab", Lance Corporal "Dinger" and Trooper "Stan") were all captured by the Iraqi military. A few days later the men are called into a meeting with the SAS commanding officer at Stirling Lines to discuss their failed mission. When the men ask why a rescue team did not attempt to pick them up, they are told they were given the wrong military radio frequencies and the only garbled message received by SAS headquarters in Saudi Arabia requesting extraction mentioned "compromised" and "S60 triple A", thus it was decided not to risk sending helicopters so close to anti aircraft artillery. When Coburn retorts that their emergency RV was well outside of the range of the S60's they are bluntly informed that the regiment's priority was to prevent further Scud missile launches and thus were willing to sacrifice the Bravo Two Zero patrol in order to conserve the available Chinooks for the four other SAS half squadrons operating behind enemy lines.

== Differences in accounts by patrol members ==
Several literary accounts had been published regarding the mission, most prominently the 1993 'Bravo Two Zero' book by patrol commander "Andy McNab". In the prologue of the Soldier Five book, Coburn states that he and the other members of the actual Bravo Two Zero patrol who remained in the SAS grew frustrated at the narrative of what happened being distorted while they were unable to publicly comment due to legal restraints. Despite being alongside McNab the entire time up until a couple of hours before he was captured on the Iraqi side of the border near Abu Kamal, several significant differences between the men's recollections have been recorded, such as:

Andy McNab account	Mike Coburn account
the patrol members invented a pre-prepared cover story, without telling their superiors, about being a Combat Search and Rescue team who got stranded after their helicopter made an emergency landing	while planning the mission, the Commanding Officer of B Squadron ordered the patrol to use the Combat Search and Rescue team cover story in the event of capture
while planning the mission, the patrol members decided to go in on foot rather than take vehicles to reduce the risk of being discovered	the patrol was forced to go in on foot as no vehicles were available to transport the eight men plus their equipment
the missions primary goal was to locate and sabotage a fiber optic Iraqi military communications line, with a secondary objective of destroying Scud launchers	the missions primary goal was to locate and destroy Scud launchers, with a secondary objective of sabotaging Iraqi military fiber optic cables
the patrol was to attack any personnel guarding Scud launchers with assault rifles and then blow up the launch vehicle's command module with PETN plastic explosives	the patrol was to call in airstrikes on Scud launchers by fighter bombers on 24 hour alert via SATCOM while remaining covert
the patrol was intentionally dropped off by a Royal Air Force Chinook helicopter approximately 20 kilometers from the proposed location of their observation post on the MSR	the patrol was supposed to have been dropped off around 10 kilometers from the proposed location of their observation post however the RAF landed less than 2 kilometers from the MSR by mistake
the patrol members decided to exfiltrate to Syria after being discovered by Iraqi civilians near Haditha	while planning the mission, the Commanding Officer of B Squadron ordered the patrol to E&E into Syria in the event of an emergency
the patrol engaged in a close range firefight with Iraqi military using Minimis and M16/M203s while withdrawing, also launching several LAW rockets at their armoured personnel carriers and throwing grenades into their vehicles after fire and maneuvering up to their location, killing many Iraqi troops and destroying several APCs	after being discovered, Iraqi troops and a single APC ineffectually open fire on the patrol from a distance of 600 meters and the patrol return suppressive fire from their 5.56mm caliber weapons only in order to escape, with no casualties observed on the Iraqi side
the patrol exfiltrate north-west towards the Syrian border immediately after the firefight with Iraqi troops	the patrol head south towards their emergency RV in the hope search and rescue helicopters will pick up their TACBE radio signal immediately after the firefight with Iraqi troops
the men hijack a taxi and drive off towards the border after first dumping all the passengers at the roadside	the men hijack a taxi and discover one of the passengers wearing a military uniform, and take him with them as a guide
the men join the queue of cars at a vehicle security checkpoint, shoot an Iraqi soldier approaching their car and run off into the night while exchanging fire with soldiers at the checkpoint	the men stop the vehicle 600 meters from a vehicle security checkpoint on the outskirts of Al-Karābilah and sneak off into the night, however the soldiers at the checkpoint open fire on them after being alerted by the passenger they took hostage
McNab and Coburn get split from the other men after trying to sneak through farmland in complete darkness	the men stumble into an ambush by dug in Iraqi troops in fixed positions, and when they withdraw under fire Coburn and McNab end up alone beside the Euphrates river
McNab and Coburn attempt to sneak through Iraqi positions and shoot up a parked truck full of troops after being spotted by one	Coburn and McNab did not open fire again after the ambush
McNab and Coburn run out of ammunition after laying down suppressing fire on Iraqi troops running towards the parked truck	Coburn and McNab discover they have no ammunition left after the ambush and dump their weapons in the river in order to have less equipment to carry
McNab and Coburn stumble into an ambush, and while McNab manages to escape Coburn falls to the ground after apparently being shot dead by Iraqi troops	Coburn and McNab continue to sneak through Iraqi positions, and after coming under fire Coburn manages to crawl into a ditch while McNab escapes back towards the river

== Legal issues ==
Coburn continued to serve with A Squadron of the SAS after his return from the Persian Gulf. In early 1996, in the aftermath of several books by former SAS members being published, the UK Ministry of Defence was canvased by serving SAS members to have all members of the United Kingdom Special Forces sign binding contracts to "prevent unauthorized disclosure". In May 1996, all SAS personnel were informed that confidentiality contracts would soon be served on them, and that if they did not sign they would be involuntary returned to unit. In late October 1996, Coburn (who was then seconded to MI5) was summoned to SAS regimental headquarters in Hereford to sign his confidentially contract, which he did without getting legal advice or having a copy of the signed contract provided to him.

Coburn thereafter decided to apply for premature voluntary release and left the British Army in March 1997, finally returning home to New Zealand. In 1998 Coburn decided that he wanted to put his own version of the Bravo Two Zero mission in the public domain and entered into a contract with a New Zealand publisher, who sent a copy of the draft book to the Ministry of Defence. The UK Attorney-General then commenced injunction proceedings in the High Court of New Zealand to prevent its publication. Coburn pleaded that he had signed the contract because he was ordered to by a military officer, and as such it had been obtained by duress thus it was an unconscionable bargain.

The New Zealand Court of Appeal upheld the confidentiality contract signed by Coburn as a member of UK special forces, ruling that there was valid consideration, that it was not an unconscionable bargain, and that it was not the result of duress or undue influence. However, the Court declined to order an injunction against its publication, noting that Coburn had not waived his right to freedom of expression and that the matters contained in the book were now in the public domain. Coburn appealed the judgement to the Judicial Committee of the Privy Council, who made a ruling (R v Attorney General for England and Wales) that he did not sign the contract while under duress.

== See also ==
- Bravo Two Zero (actual events)
- Bravo Two Zero (1993 book)
- The One That Got Away (1995 book)
