= Bravo Two Zero (novel) =

1993 book by Andy McNab

- First edition
- Author: Andy McNab
- Language: English
- Genre: Special Forces / Gulf War
- Publisher: Bantam Press
- Publication date: October 1993
- Publication place: United Kingdom
- Media type: Print (hardback and paperback)
- Pages: 411
- ISBN: 0-552-14127-5
- OCLC: 31377154
- Followed by: Immediate Action

Bravo Two Zero is a 1993 book written under the pseudonym Andy McNab. The book is a partially fictional account of an SAS patrol that becomes compromised while operating behind enemy lines in Iraq, in 1991. The patrol was led by the author and included another future writer, Chris Ryan.

== Plot ==
After completing a nine-month Counter Terrorist standby duty at their headquarters (Stirling Lines), B Squadron 22 SAS are posted to Saudi Arabia in January 1991 to prepare for the Coalition ground invasion of Iraq. The SAS commanding officers task Sergeant Andy McNab (a.k.a. Steven Billy Mitchell) with leading an eight-man patrol on a special reconnaissance mission behind enemy lines in the Anbar Province of western Iraq. The patrol, which had a call sign of Bravo Two Zero, was primarily tasked to locate and then sabotage underground fiber optic cables used by the Iraqi military for communications, with a secondary objective to find and destroy Iraqi Scud missile launchers. After being dropped off by Chinook helicopter approximately 30 kilometres to the west of Haditha, the patrol move their supplies into a dried up river bed and wait until night time before patrolling the surrounding area. The team discovers a much larger enemy presence than expected, and are unable to get their military radio to work properly. They are soon discovered by a young shepherd, and engage in a firefight with the Iraqi military with Minimis and M16/M203s while withdrawing, also launching several LAW rockets at their armoured personnel carriers in an effort to escape. The patrol abandon their supplies of food, water, and ammunition, retreating into the desert as darkness falls.

While exfiltrating north-west towards the Syrian border, the patrol gets split into two groups while McNab attempts to contact an overhead Coalition fighter jet using a TACBE communicator. The patrol continues towards the border, hiding during the day and moving only at night to avoid detection. With the cold weather worsening and his remaining patrol members starting to suffer from hypothermia, McNab decides to hijack a civilian vehicle to drive the remaining distance to the frontier before the next morning. The group are discovered at a vehicle security checkpoint close to the border and run off into the desert after a brief exchange of gunfire. Several more skirmishes occur between the patrol and Iraq military units around the outskirts of Al-Karābilah, before the patrol is split again and McNab ends up on his own. With no ammunition remaining, and dawn fast approaching, McNab decides to hide under a bridge until the following night and then attempt to cross the border into Abu Kamal.

McNab is caught by Iraqi military the following afternoon and taken to a local army camp, where he discovers fellow patrol member "Dinger" (a.k.a. Lance Corporal Ian Robert Pring) has also been captured. The two men are interrogated and beaten, before being handed over to Iraqi military intelligence and moved to a detention center on the outskirts of Baghdad. McNab and Dinger tell their captors a pre-prepared cover story that they are part of a Combat Search and Rescue team who got stranded after their helicopter made an emergency landing, however the Iraq's allege they are part of the commando team who engaged in the earlier firefight against the APCs. After several days of mistreatment, McNab decides to give a vague "confession" that they are part of a close observation platoon monitoring enemy movements on the Iraqi main supply route (MSR) between Baghdad and northwestern Iraq. Believing them, the intelligence agents move the men to Abu Ghraib prison, and they are eventually released soon after the end of the Gulf War.

== Controversy ==
The content of the book was criticised by fellow Bravo Two Zero patrol member Malcolm MacGown, who stated that "incidents such as teeth extraction and burning with a heated spoon did not happen. It is inconceivable that any such incidents could have occurred without them being discussed or being physically obvious".

Michael Asher's investigative book The Real Bravo Two Zero criticised McNab's estimation of the number of soldiers the patrol encountered. According to Asher, the patrol never actually encountered soldiers, only police and armed civilians.

According to the book, at one stage, the patrol evicted all of the occupants from a taxi and drove until they reached a military checkpoint, where Lane shot and killed one soldier, while the others in the group killed two more. According to patrol member Chris Ryan's second-hand account (presumably taken from the Regimental debrief), the group were actually driven to a police checkpoint by one of the Iraqi occupants of the taxi. They discreetly exited the vehicle with plans to rendezvous on the other side of the checkpoint, but the driver alerted the police, and the group was forced to continue on foot. Asher's investigation supported Ryan's version of events, with no reported soldiers, no reported armed contact, and no reported Iraqi casualties.

The SAS's Regimental Sergeant Major at the time the book is set, and fellow Gulf War veteran Peter Ratcliffe said of the book (and of The One That Got Away (1995), "[It is] insensitive on [Ryan's] and [McNab's] parts to hide behind pseudonyms when they named their dead colleagues in their books, in deliberate contravention of the Regiment's traditions".

Ratcliffe further wrote in his own book, Eye of the Storm, "I was somewhat taken aback by many of [McNab's] anecdotes. He made no mention of the meetings he had with the CO and myself [in] which we tried to persuade him to take a vehicle or cut down on the amount of kit the patrol would be carrying". As with Asher, Ratcliffe also cited McNab's estimate of 250 enemy casualties as counter to any proven theory of military kill ratios, but most importantly, the figure was never mentioned in any of the Regimental debriefs given by McNab at the time.

== Subsequent introduction of confidentiality agreements ==
One of the effects of the book's publication and other memoirs resulted in the MoD introducing confidentiality agreements. These meant that serving members could no longer publish memoirs or accounts without the prior agreement of the MoD. Soldiers who refused to sign these agreements faced being RTU: the author of Soldier Five was pursued through the New Zealand courts to stop the publication of his book. Those who did publish their experiences, or were suspected of having been sources for journalists, were blacklisted and cut off from any association with Hereford.

== See also ==
- Bravo Two Zero (actual events)
- Bravo Two Zero (1999 film)
- The One That Got Away (1995 book)
- The One That Got Away (1996 film)
- Soldier Five (2004 book)
