= Death of Bernard Mongan =

British soldier who died at age 33

Lance Corporal Bernard Mongan, often called Bernie, was a British soldier serving with the Royal Signals, who in 2020 aged 33 was found dead in Catterick Garrison barracks.

== Life ==
Bernard Mongan, was born in Bristol, England, though he spent most of his childhood in Ireland and there developed a "soft southern Irish accent" according to the newspaper IrishCentral. He joined the British Army's Irish Guards in 2004 and fought in the Iraq War, leaving the British Army in 2012 only to rejoin in 2015 with the Royal Corps of Signals. He had three children with his wife Beth who he had separated from, though they remained on friendly terms.

During his time in the army, Mongan was allegedly repeatedly bullied by fellow soldiers and senior officers, and shortly before his death had begun keeping records of his "perceived mistreatment" including issues with two sergeants against which he considered lodging a formal service complaint. Incidents reported by colleagues at a 2025 inquest included: Mongan had been screamed at by superior officers in front of other soldiers while on military exercises, made to clean officers' cars in his own time, and been "forced" to do extra runs in his lunch breaks without being given time to eat after failing a fitness test – going against the army's policy that 'Physical exercise is not allowed to be used in the British Army as a punishment'. The BBC reported after his death that Mongan had tried to kill himself several times after the breakdown of his marriage, and spent time at a recovery centre run by Help For Heroes in 2016.

=== Assault ===
Mongan was the victim of a serious assault at Catterick Garrison in 2018, with a police investigation into the events still ongoing at the time of his death.

According to the mother of his children Beth, Mongan had been "violently assaulted by two soldiers from Northern Ireland in November 2018." She went onto say, Mongan:

...had been bullied quite a bit over the last couple of years. He was beaten up and as far as I am aware it is being treated as a racist incident. There were several other occasions when he felt he was being treated unfairly by senior members of his battalion.

Bella Innes, a veteran support worker who had personally known Mongan for a decade, commented on the attack:

Bernie was intensely bullied. He told me he was beaten up by two Irish Guardsmen because he had a southern Irish accent. He said they called him a terrorist, beat him to the ground and jumped on his head. His face was black and blue. I know he has been bullied a lot in the past.

== Death ==
Mongan was due to start an attachment with the British Army's 77th Brigade at Denison Barracks in Hermitage, Berkshire on 7 January 2020, which he was said to have been happy about and looking forward to; however, neither Catterick Garrison nor his new unit noticed that he was missing after failing to report for his new posting. On 23 January 2020, three weeks after last been seen, Mongan's body was discovered after an "unusual smell" was noticed coming from his room in the accommodation block at Catterick Garrison barracks.

Mongan's funeral was held on 20 February in Ossett, West Yorkshire, England.

== Legacy ==
In 2020 Mongan's mother, Mary Mongan, began a Change.org petition "to gather support to reveal the answers about her son's mysterious death" and uploaded a tribute to Mongan's life on Facebook.

An army investigation into his death, in July 2021, found that "failings in the proper management of personnel led to the delay in the discovery of L/Cpl Mongan". The same investigation also found that reports of bullying committed against Mongan were not properly investigated. The head of the Army Services Group, Brigadier Edward Chamberlain, released a statement, following the army investigation, saying, "There were clearly failings in our duty of care to Lance Corporal Mongan. The delay in discovering he was deceased was unacceptable and profoundly regrettable. We are truly sorry that such a situation should have arisen."

An inquest into Mongan's death opened in June 2025, with new evidence heard that one army officer "had been posting videos on a WhatsApp group of humiliations of Bernie" while he was still alive. Barbiturates including Promethazine and Phenobarbital, which have a sedating effect, were found in his system suggesting poisoning as a cause of death; however, due to the advanced decomposition of the corpse, it was reported doctors found it difficult to determine. The attending paramedic when Mongan's body was found told the inquest that there was "no evidence of self-harm or suicide", adding:

There were no empty medication bottles nearby or signs of self-harm and [the body] had severe stages of decomposition, which made it harder to work out his death.

Also giving evidence, pathologist Dr Nigel Cooper commented:

The levels of the two drugs can't kill him alone and would require a third substance, there was an empty Jack Daniel's whiskey bottle found in his room...but no evidence of when or how quickly the alcohol was consumed.

He added that there had been nothing such as problems with L/Cpl Mongan's heart or brain to explain his sudden death, and no injuries had been found on his body. The inquiry finished by recording an open conclusion, with the cause of death still "unascertained". Bernie’s widow Beth stated to the media after the inquiry closed that it was her belief that Bernie had taken his own life. An army spokesperson told the media:

We deeply regret and apologise for the shortfalls in our duty of care towards him [Mongan], which were clearly unacceptable.
