= Michael Asher (explorer) =

English explorer and author

Michael Asher FRSL (born 1953) is an English desert explorer, writer, historian, deep ecologist, and educator. He lived for some years with nomads in the Sudan whose lives were unchanged by modernity. He has lived and travelled in the Sahara and the Arabian Desert, published both non-fiction and fiction works based on his explorations and encounters, and presented several documentaries based on his published works. Asher was the final recipient of the Lawrence Memorial Medal of the Royal Society for Asian Affairs.

== Early and personal life ==
Michael Asher was born in Stamford, Lincolnshire, where his father, Frederick Asher was a chartered surveyor; his mother, Kathleen Asher, was a State-Registered Nurse. Asher attended Stamford School, then a direct grant grammar school. He later graduated from the University of Leeds, where he studied English Language and Linguistics. He has spent much of his adult life in Africa, and speaks Arabic and Swahili. He is married to Arabist and photographer Mariantonietta Peru, with whom he has a son and a daughter.

== Career ==
=== Military experience ===
As a young man he served in the Parachute Regiment, the SAS reserve, and the Special Patrol Group of the Royal Ulster Constabulary. During his training in the Parachute Regiment in 1971, Asher's best friend, Steve Parkin, also 18, was mortally wounded next to him during a live fire exercise. This experience had a lasting effect on Asher, who was a pall-bearer at Parkin's funeral. He later wrote about it in his book Shoot to Kill - A Soldier's Journey Through Violence and in The Oasis of the Last Story. After passing selection, he was posted to the 2nd Battalion, and saw three tours of duty in Northern Ireland. During this time, he was shot at, and saw eleven comrades killed by radio-controlled bombs. He was awarded the General Service Medal. Later, while an undergraduate at the University of Leeds he passed selection for the SAS, and served in B Squadron, 23 Special Air Service Regiment (Reserve), based in Leeds. The day he was presented with the sand-coloured SAS beret, he said, was, up to that point, 'just about the best day of my life'. Asher subsequently served as a police constable in the Blue Section of the Special Patrol Group of the Royal Ulster Constabulary - a mobile unit whose main task was anti-terrorist patrols. Disillusioned with the military and law enforcement paths, he resigned after less than a year to become a volunteer teacher in the Sudan.

=== Desert travels and life with desert nomads ===
In 1979, Asher went to the Sudan to work as a volunteer English teacher. In his first vacation he bought a camel and travelled about 1500 miles (2,400 km) across Kordofan and Darfur, joining up with a camel-herd being taken north to Egypt along the ancient trade-route known as the Darb al-Arbaʿīn (Forty Days Road).

He later transferred to al-Gineina, on the Chad-Sudan border, a small town without electricity or running water, where he lived in a mud cabin, kept his own camels, and made frequent solo journeys by camel in Darfur, covering more than 1000 miles (1,600 km) – experiences that formed the basis of his first book, In Search of the Forty Days Road, which he wrote on a mechanical typewriter in his hut in Gineina. He recounts how he returned home one day to find that a cow had broken into the hut and was in the act of chewing part of the first draft, most of which he never recovered.

In 1982, Asher went to live among the Kababish nomads of the western Sudan, with whom he stayed for most of the next three years. This experience, which became the subject of the book, A Desert Dies, focuses on the way of life of these people, and their decimation by a drought that began in 1984. On a visit to Khartoum in 1985, Asher was asked by UNICEF Sudan to organize a camel caravan in the Red Sea Hills to take aid to Beja people cut off by drought and famine.

During this expedition, Asher met photographer and Arabist Mariantonietta Peru - an Italian from Sardinia - with whom he subsequently embarked on a 4,500-mile (7,200 km) West-to-East trek across the Sahara on foot and camel-back, a trip that became the subject of the book, Impossible Journey. The idea for the trek was influenced by the work of British author Geoffrey Moorhouse who had unsuccessfully attempted the crossing in 1972. Setting off from Chinguetti in Mauritania, in August 1986, with three camels, Asher and Peru passed through Mauritania, Mali, Niger, Chad, and the Sudan, and finally arrived at the Nile at Abu Simbel in southern Egypt in May 1987, having made a journey of 271 days and 4,500 miles (7,200 km) by camel, the first recorded crossing of the Sahara from west to east by non-mechanical means. It was perhaps the first great journey of African exploration to be achieved by a man and a woman together.

In 1988, Asher began work as Project Officer for the Joint WHO/UNICEF Nutrition Support Project (JNSP) among the Beja nomads in the Red Sea Hills of eastern Sudan.. He ran the project - a rural rehabilitation programme - from Port Sudan, but travelled frequently in the hills, talking to nomads and staying in their camps.

In 1991, Asher crossed the Western Desert, by camel, from Mersa Matruh on the Mediterranean coast, to Aswan in southern Egypt - a distance of 1,000 miles (1,600 km). He travelled for two months with a single Bedouin companion, and for the first month they saw no other human beings. Two of Asher's five camels died on the way.

In 2002 Asher began to lead commercial treks by camel in the Bayuda Desert of the Sudan, working with Exodus Travels UK. He continued to lead these treks regularly until 2014. He also led regular camel treks for Exodus in the Hammada du Draa and Erg Chebbi, Morocco, from 2001 to 2010.

In 2008, Asher returned to Darfur, western Sudan, with a team of researchers, under the aegis of UNEP, to make a study of the Janjaweed horsemen-militias who had been involved in the civil war. He was a co-author of the paper the team subsequently produced.

=== The Real Bravo Two Zero ===
In 2000, Asher was commissioned to go to Iraq with a film crew to investigate discrepancies between the books Bravo Two Zero by 'Andy McNab' and The One That Got Away by 'Chris Ryan' - members of the SAS patrol Bravo Two Zero in the first Gulf War of 1990. One of Asher's aims was to discover the truth about Sgt. Vince Phillips, who had died during the operation and had been blamed for its failure. The book Bravo Two Zero, billed as 'a true story of the SAS in action' sold over 1.7 million copies. Following in the patrol's footsteps in the Iraqi desert, speaking to eye-witnesses in Arabic, Asher's discoveries suggested that much of the material in both books was fabricated, and that, in particular, there was no evidence that the patrol had killed any Iraqi troops. Asher also found direct evidence from eye-witnesses to show that Vince Phillips was not a coward and was not responsible for what went wrong. Phillips' family had suffered "11 years of torture" due to the calumnies poured on him by 'McNab' and 'Ryan'. Asher's book The Real Bravo Two Zero and his documentary of the same name caused a storm of controversy. The book reached No 5 in the Sunday Times best-seller charts in both hardback and paperback.

=== Education and deep ecology ===
In 2010, Asher began writing a column on deep ecology and environmental issues in the Kenyan national daily newspaper The Star. The theme of his writing was summed up in a piece entitled Stop Ruining Nature or Join the Dinosaurs "...the Earth is sacred... nature isn't there for mankind to plunder, but is of intrinsic value in itself" ..."Nature not technology, is the true source of our wealth. If we are to preserve the biosphere - and ourselves - the 'development' process has to stop."

From 2014 to 2019, Asher taught English literature and language - including creative writing - at Hillcrest International School, Nairobi, Kenya. In co-curricular activities he headed the debate society, coached fencing, and ran a survival club with the help of indigenous people.

In his current educational activities and writing, Asher is known for stressing the importance of 'interbeing' - the interconnectedness of all things, and harmony with nature, which he says was a feature of nomad society.

=== Documentary films ===
- In Search of Lawrence (1997); A Channel 4 documentary retracing the footsteps of T. E. Lawrence, using the same methods of transport, equipment and resources Lawrence would have used in his day, and with a Bedouin descendant of Lawrence's companion, Auda Abu Tayi of the Howeitat, in order to test the claims made in the book Seven Pillars of Wisdom.
- Death, Deceit and the Nile (2000); Reconstructing the 1856 expedition by Burton and Speke to discover the source of the Nile, Asher and Peru travel by sailing dhow from Zanzibar to Bagamoyo in Tanzania, and with donkeys to Lake Tanganyika, ending their journey at Lake Victoria.
- The Real Bravo Two Zero (2002); In 2000, Asher was commissioned by Channel 4 TV to go to Iraq with a film crew to investigate the story of the SAS patrol, Bravo Two Zero, retracing in the eight-man patrol's steps in the Iraqi desert. The resulting documentary and Asher's book by the same name sought to disprove allegations that Sergeant Vince Phillips, who died on the mission, was responsible for its failure.
- Survivors (2008); Directed and presented by Asher, the film looks at the lives of survivors of the 1998 bombing of the US embassy in Nairobi by al-Qaeda, including Muslim families indiscriminately targeted. The film was shown on Nation TV, Kenya
- Paradise is Burning (2008); Asher talks to survivors of the bombing of the Paradise Hotel, Kilifi, Kenya, by al-Qaeda. Shown on KBC, Kenya.
- Stalking Hitler's Generals (2012); Shot in Libya just before the fall of Gaddafi, this documentary is partly based on Asher's book, Get Rommel and is about the British attempts to assassinate Erwin Rommel and the successful kidnapping of Heinrich Kreipe. Shown on NatGeo TV.

== Published works ==
Asher is the author of ten novels and fourteen non-fiction works, various of which are published in thirteen languages including Arabic, Chinese, Hungarian, Lithuanian, and Korean. The non-fiction books include works of travel about his journeys and experiences with nomads in the desert, historical works such as Get Rommel, about Operation Flipper, the British attempt to assassinate Erwin Rommel in Libya in 1941, Sands of Death, about the Flatters expedition of 1881 and the Tuareg, and Khartoum, the Ultimate Imperial Adventure, the story of the fall of Khartoum, the Gordon Relief Expedition and the reconquest of the Sudan. He has written two biographies: Thesiger - A Biography - a life of explorer Wilfred Thesiger - and Lawrence - The Uncrowned King of Arabia, a life of T. E. Lawrence.

Asher's 2022 book, The Oasis of the Last Story - Tales from the Desert, is a break from his previous work. He began writing it after what he described as a 'near death experience' in 2020. The book is a web of tales within tales set in the desert, connected by a narrative of adventure and unexpected encounters. A 'fictionalized autobiography', based on Asher's actual experiences but condensed into a single journey, the book tells the story of a former SAS soldier, who goes in search of a legendary lost oasis, and, after a series of rites of passage with desert nomads, undergoes a spiritual rebirth.

Asher's writing has appeared in many newspapers and magazines, including The Guardian, Daily Mail, Mail on Sunday, Washington Post, Daily Telegraph The Observer, The Scotsman, Scotland on Sunday, Sunday Times, Sunday Telegraph, Conde Nast Traveler, Geographical, World, New Scientist, Reader's Digest, African Business, and Hello!.

=== Novels ===
- The Eye of Ra (1999)
- Firebird (2000)
- Rare Earth (2002)
- Sandstorm (2003)
- The Last Commando (2009)
- The Flaming Sword (2010)
- Highroad to Hell (2012)
- Code of Combat. (2014)
- The Colour of Fire (2018)

=== Stories ===
- The Oasis of the Last Story: Tales from the Desert (2022)

=== Non-fiction ===
- In Search of the Forty Days Road: Adventures with the Nomads of the Desert (1984)
- A Desert Dies (1986)
- Impossible Journey – Two Against the Sahara (1988)
- Shoot to Kill: A Soldier's Journey Through Violence (1990) ISBN 0-304-36628-5
- Thesiger – A Biography (1994)
- Sahara (with Kazuyoshi Nomachi) (1996)
- Phoenix Rising – The UAE Past, Present & Future (with Werner Forman) (1996)
- The Last of the Bedu: In Search of the Myth (1996)
- Lawrence: The Uncrowned King of Arabia (1998)
- The Real Bravo Two Zero: The Truth Behind Bravo Two Zero (2002)
- Get Rommel: The British Plot to Kill Hitler's Greatest General (2004)
- Khartoum: The Ultimate Imperial Adventure (2005); Penguin Books, London 2006, ISBN 978-014025855-4.
- Sands of Death: An Epic Tale of Massacre and Survival in the Sahara (2007)
- The Regiment: The Real Story of the SAS (2007), republished as The Regiment: The Definitive Story of the SAS (2018)

=== Philosophical essays ===
- How Schopenhauer Saved Tolstoy's Life (2022)
- Spinoza was an Idealist (2023)
- Non-dualism in ancient Greece? Dionysos as infinite, eternal, conscious life (2024)

== Awards and honours ==
- 1994 – Ness Award of the Royal Geographical Society
- 1996 – Elected Fellow of the Royal Society of Literature
- 1997 – Mungo Park Medal of the Royal Scottish Geographical Society
- 2016 – Lawrence Memorial Medal of the Royal Society for Asian Affairs
