= R v Attorney General for England and Wales =

New Zealand contract law case

"R" v Attorney General for England and Wales Privy Council Appeal No. 61 of 2002
- Court: Judicial Committee of the Privy Council
- Full case name: "R", Appellant v. Her Majesty's Attorney-General for England and Wales, Respondent
- Decided: 17 March 2003
- Citations: [2003] UKPC 22, [2003] EMLR 499, [2004] 2 NZLR 577

Case history
- Prior actions: Trial judge ruled that "R" had been subject to undue influence and duress when presented with an agreement for hs signature. Court of Appeal of New Zealand REVERSED IN PART by declining to enjoin against publication by "R" but allowing the Attorney-General to seek damages and recompense for breach of contract.
- Appealed from: Court of Appeal of New Zealand

Case opinions
- Judgment of the Court of Appeal of New Zealand UPHELD, their Lordships humbly advised Her Majesty that the appeal should be dismissed. The Attorney-General did not ask for costs.
- Decision by: Lord Hoffman
- Concurrence: Lord Bingham of Cornhill; Lord Steyn; Lord Millett
- Dissent: Lord Scott of Foscote

Keywords
- Duress, undue influence

"R" v Attorney General for England and Wales [2003] UKPC 22 is a New Zealand contract law case, heard by the Privy Council acting as the final court of appeal of New Zealand and not as part of the judiciary of the UK, relating to duress and undue influence.

== Facts ==
After the Gulf War, a Special Air Service soldier of the Bravo Two Zero patrol, known in the proceedings as "R", was told to sign a confidentiality agreement or be demoted. He signed. Then he returned to New Zealand. He obtained a publishing contract for his memoirs concerning his service in the Gulf War. The Attorney-General for England and Wales sought an injunction in the New Zealand courts blocking publication on the basis that it violated the confidentiality agreement.

The New Zealand Court of Appeal denied an injunction, but allowed an account of profits and an assessment of damages for breach of contract. R appealed to the Privy Council, contending that he was under duress when he signed the contract, given the threat of demotion. Additionally R contended that the contract was signed under undue influence, given the position of the MOD in relation to him.

== Advice ==
The Privy Council advised that the contract was not avoidable for duress. Lord Hoffmann said there was no illegitimate pressure, so no duress. That first element is "pressure amounting to compulsion of the will of the victim and the second was the illegitimacy of the pressure".

Generally speaking, the threat of any form of unlawful action will be regarded as illegitimate. On the other hand, the fact that the threat is lawful does not necessarily make the pressure legitimate. As Lord Atkin said in Thorne v Motor Trade Association [1937] AC 797, 806, ‘The ordinary blackmailer normally threatens to do what he has a perfect right to do - namely, communicate some compromising conduct to a person whose knowledge is likely to affect the person threatened… What he has to justify is not the threat, but the demand of money.'

In addition, the court reviewed whether a type of relationship existed between the Crown and the Ministry of Defence that raised the presumption of undue influence. The court found that such a relationship had in law arisen but went on to state that, for this presumption to arise, there must be a transaction that requires explanation. They held that this was not a transaction that required explanation.

== See also ==
- English contract law
- Iniquitous pressure in English law
- Lloyds Bank Ltd v Bundy [1975] QB 326
- Williams v. Walker-Thomas Furniture Co. 350 F.2d 445 (C.A. D.C. 1965)
