= The One That Got Away (book) =

1995 biographical book by Chris Ryan

- Author: Chris Ryan
- Language: English
- Genre: War/Non fiction
- Publisher: Century
- Publication date: July 1995
- Publication place: United Kingdom
- Media type: Print (Hardcover & Paperback)
- Pages: 251
- ISBN: 0-7126-7616-3
- OCLC: 33102962
- Followed by: Stand By, Stand By (1996)

The One That Got Away is a 1995 book written under the pseudonym 'Chris Ryan' concerning the SAS patrol Bravo Two Zero, which was dropped behind enemy lines in Iraq in 1991. The author was a member of the patrol and tells of his 8 day escape on foot to the Syrian border.

== Controversy ==
- The content of the book was heavily criticised by fellow Bravo Two Zero patrol members Mike Coburn and Malcolm MacGown in Coburn's Soldier Five, written specifically in response to this book.
- Despite the book describing Ryan's single-handed attack on two Iraqi Land Rover type vehicles, and killing two Iraqi soldiers with a knife, the SAS's Regimental Sergeant Major at the time of the patrol and fellow Gulf War veteran, Peter Ratcliffe, stated that at the Regimental debrief, "[Ryan] made no mention at all of encountering enemy troops on his trek.".
- Coburn, along with patrol members Andy McNab and Ian Pring all wrote letters to deceased patrol member Vince Phillips' family subsequent to the release of this book. Coburn wrote: "At no time throughout the patrol did Vince display the actions portrayed... ...On the contrary, the very fact that he was on patrol disputes [Ryan's] version of events, otherwise he would never have been allowed to deploy across the border." Pring described the book as "a pack of lies" writing: "Vince DID NOT compromise the patrol or behave in the manner portrayed."
- Michael Asher's investigative book, The Real Bravo Two Zero, released in 2003, also criticised Ryan's portrayal of Phillips. Asher found that many of the negative attributes Ryan had described did not correspond with the available evidence, nor the other patrol members' accounts.
- Concerning the TV adaptation of Ryan's book, McNab further wrote in a letter to The Times in 1996, "It is a pity that [Ryan] chose to cheapen his own achievement and the reputations of the regiment and of comrades who would have sacrificed their lives for his, had the situation demanded, by denigrating those of others."
- Ratcliffe said of the book (and of Bravo Two Zero), "[It is] insensitive on [Ryan's] and [McNab's] parts to hide behind pseudonyms when they named their dead colleagues in their books, in deliberate contravention of the Regiment's traditions.".
- Coburn also commented on the book: "The portrayal of Vince Phillips was a despicable betrayal of what happened. Revelations became more and more outrageous, culminating in a book and film that saw him portrayed in an unfair and undignified manner.".

== See also ==
- The One That Got Away (1996 film)
- Bravo Two Zero (1993 novel)
- Bravo Two Zero (1999 film)
- Soldier Five (2004 book)
