= Bravo Two Zero (film) =

1999 British television series

- DVD cover
- Based on: Bravo Two Zero by Andy McNab
- Written by: Troy Kennedy-Martin
- Directed by: Tom Clegg
- Starring: Sean Bean; Steve Nicolson; Rick Warden; Richard Graham; Ian Curtis
- Theme music composer: David Ferguson
- Country of origin: United Kingdom
- Original language: English
- No. of series: 1
- No. of episodes: 2

Production
- Producer: Ruth Caleb
- Cinematography: Rod Stewart
- Editor: Ettie M. Feldman
- Running time: 54 minutes
- Production companies: Distant Horizon; Icon Entertainment International; Videovision Entertainment

Original release
- Network: BBC One
- Release: 3 January – 4 January 1999

Bravo Two Zero is a 1999 two-hour television film (broadcast in two parts between 3 and 4 January in the UK), based on the 1993 book of the same name by Andy McNab. The film covers real life events – from the perspective of Andy McNab, patrol commander of Bravo Two Zero, a British SAS patrol, tasked to find Iraqi Scud missile launchers during the Gulf War in 1991. The names of the patrol members killed were changed.

Bravo Two Zero was directed by Tom Clegg. A previous film about the patrol, The One That Got Away, based on the book of the same name by Chris Ryan, was broadcast in 1996 though it follows the perspective of Corporal Chris Ryan (Colin Armstrong).

== Cast ==
- Sean Bean as Andy McNab
- Kevin Collins as Chris
- Steve Nicolson as "Dinger"
- Rick Warden as Tony Benotti
- Richard Graham as Mark Warner
- Ian Curtis as Baz Brown
- Jamie Bartlett as Ray Davies
- Robert Hobbs as Stan Rigby
- Ron Senior Jr as Pete
- Robert Whitehead as Iraqi Colonel
- Caz Abrahams as White Socks
- Nick Ashby as Jeral
- Barry Berk as Cyril
- Julia Booth as Sally
- Melissa Carter as Katie
- Dimitri Cassar as Iraqi officer #1
- Emma Chambers as Dinger's wife
- Alison Coles as Jilly
- George Coutsoudis as Son in taxi
- Ernst Eloff as Iraqi Farmer
- Arishaad Erreeff as Shepherd
- Anthony Fridjohn as Dentist
- Thomas Hall as Gordon
- Graham Hopkins as Graham
- Akram Ibrahim as Prison Governor
- Brent King as Shepherd boy
- Maki Kossioris as Father in taxi
- Dehan Liebenberg as Loadie #1
- Tim Mahoney as Harry
- Anna Meininger as Melissa
- Nissam Moalem as Taxi driver
- Alistair Prodgers as Bert
- Nicky Rebello as Interrogator
- Louise Saint-Claire as Red Cross worker
- Abdallah Sardi as S60 Commander
- Russel Savadier as Iraqi Captain
- Yvonne Van Den Berg as Woman in bar
