= Bravo Two Zero =

SAS Gulf War patrol

Bravo Two Zero was the call sign of an eight-man British Army Special Air Service (SAS) patrol deployed into Iraq during the First Gulf War in January 1991. Three members of the patrol died during the mission, and a further four were captured by Iraqi forces and eventually released. The patrol has been the subject of several books, with conflicting descriptions of the events of the patrol.

== Patrol members ==
Bravo Two Zero patrol members. From left to right: Ryan, Consiglio, MacGown (obscured), Lane, Coburn (obscured), McNab (obscured), Phillips, Pring (obscured).

Sergeant Steven Billy Mitchell, DCM, MM, patrol commander
former Royal Green Jackets. Captured by the enemy, later released. Author of Bravo Two Zero and referred to as "Andy McNab" in the books.
Sergeant Vincent David Phillips, patrol 2IC
former Royal Army Ordnance Corps. Died of hypothermia during action, 25 January 1991.
Corporal Colin Armstrong, MM
former 23(R) SAS. The only member of the patrol to escape capture. Author of The One That Got Away and better known under his pseudonym as "Chris Ryan".
Lance Corporal Ian Robert "Dinger" Pring MBE VR.
former Parachute Regiment. Captured by the enemy, later released.
Trooper Robert Gaspare Consiglio, MM (posthumous)
former Royal Marine 42 Cdo RM. Killed in action, 27 January 1991.
Trooper Steven John "Legs" Lane, MM (posthumous)
former Lance Corporal of 9 Parachute Squadron, Royal Engineers and former Parachute Regiment. Died of hypothermia during action, 27 January 1991.
Trooper Malcolm Graham MacGown, BDS (Univ. Syd)
former Australian 1st Commando Regiment. Captured by the enemy, later released. Referred to as "Stan" in the books.
Trooper Mike "Kiwi" Coburn (pseudonym)
former New Zealand Special Air Service. Captured by the enemy, later released. Author of Soldier Five. Referred to as "Mark the Kiwi" in the books.

== The patrol ==
=== Background ===
In January 1991, during the prelude to the Coalition ground invasion of Iraq, B Squadron 22 SAS were stationed at a forward operating base in Saudi Arabia. The squadron provided a number of long-range, similarly tasked teams deep into Iraq including three eight-man patrols: "Bravo One Zero", "Bravo Two Zero" and "Bravo Three Zero". Asher lists one of the three patrols as "Bravo One Niner", though it is not clear whether this is one of the same three listed by Ryan.

=== Insertion ===
On the night of 22/23 January, the patrol were transported into Iraqi airspace by an RAF Chinook helicopter, along with Bravo Three Zero and their Land Rover 110 vehicles. Unlike Bravo Three Zero, the patrol had decided not to take vehicles. According to McNab's account, the patrol walked 20 km (12 mi) during the first night to the proposed location of the observation post. However, both Ryan's and Coburn's accounts put the distance at 2 km (1.2 mi). Eyewitness accounts of Bedouin tribesmen and Asher's re-creation support the Ryan/Coburn estimate of 2 km (1.2 mi). Ryan states the patrol was intentionally dropped only 2 km (1.2 mi) from the observation post because of heavy pack weights.

According to both Ryan and McNab, the weight of their equipment required the patrol to "shuttle" the equipment to the observation post. Four members would walk approximately 300 m (330 yd), then drop their bergens and wait. The next four would move up and drop their bergens, then the first four would return for their jerry cans of water and bring them back to the group, followed by the second four doing the same. In this manner, each member of the patrol covered three times the distance from the drop off to the observation post.

Soon after the patrol landed on Iraqi soil, Lane discovered that they had communication problems and could not receive messages on the patrol's radio. McNab later claimed that the patrol had been issued incorrect radio frequencies; however, a 2002 BBC report discovered that there was no error with the frequencies because the patrol's transmissions had been noted in the SAS daily record log. Ratcliffe lays the blame for the faulty radios on McNab as the patrol commander; it was his job to make sure the patrol's equipment was working.

=== Compromise ===
In late afternoon of 24 January, the patrol was discovered by a young shepherd herding sheep. Believing themselves compromised, the patrol decided to withdraw, leaving behind excess equipment. As they were preparing to leave, they heard what they thought to be a tank approaching their position. The patrol took up defensive positions, prepared their LAW rockets, and waited for it to come into sight. However, the vehicle turned out to be a bulldozer, which reversed rapidly after seeing the patrol. Realising that they had now definitely been compromised, the patrol withdrew from their position. Shortly afterwards, as they were exfiltrating (according to McNab's account), a firefight with Iraqi armoured personnel carriers and soldiers began.

In 2001, Asher interviewed the Bedouin family that discovered the patrol. The family stated the patrol had been spotted by the driver of the bulldozer, not the young shepherd. According to the family, they were not sure who the men were and followed them a short distance, eventually firing several warning shots, whereupon the patrol returned fire and moved away. Asher's investigation into the events, the terrain, and position of the Iraqi Army did not support McNab's version of events, and excludes an attack by Iraqi soldiers and armoured personnel carriers. Coburn's version, Soldier Five, partially supports McNab's version of events (specifically the presence of one armoured personnel carrier) and describes being fired upon by a 12.7mm DShK heavy machine gun and numerous Iraqi soldiers. In Ryan's version, "[MacGown] also saw an armoured car carrying a .50 caliber machine gun pull up. Somehow, I never saw that." Ryan later estimated that he fired 70 rounds during the incident.

=== Emergency pickup ===
British standard operating procedure (SOP) states that in the case of an emergency or no radio contact, a patrol should return to their original infiltration point, where a helicopter will land briefly every 24 hours. This plan was complicated by the incorrect location of the initial landing site; the patrol reached the designated emergency pickup point, but the helicopter never appeared. Ratcliffe later revealed that this was due to an illness suffered by the pilot while en route, necessitating his abandoning his mission on this occasion.

Because of a malfunctioning emergency radio that allowed them only to send messages and not receive them, the patrol did not realise that while trying to reach overhead allied jets, they had in fact been heard by a US jet pilot. The jet pilots were aware of the patrol's problems but were unable to raise them. Many sorties were flown to the team's last known position and their expected exfiltration route in an attempt to locate them and to hinder attempts by Iraqi troops trying to capture them.

=== Exfiltration route ===
Standard operating procedure mandates that before an infiltration of any team behind enemy lines, an exfiltration route should be planned so that members of the patrol know where to go if they get separated or something goes wrong. The plans of the patrol indicated a southern exfiltration route towards Saudi Arabia. According to the SAS daily record log kept during that time, a TACBE (Tactical Beacon) transmission from the patrol was received on 24 January. The log read "Bravo Two Zero made TACBE contact again, it was reasonable to assume that they were moving south", though in fact the patrol headed north-west towards the Syrian border. Coburn's account suggests that during the planning phase of the mission, Syria had been the agreed-upon destination should an escape plan need to be implemented. He also suggests that this was on the advice of the officer commanding B Squadron at that time.

According to Ratcliffe, the change in plan nullified all efforts over the following days by allied forces to locate and rescue the team. McNab has been criticised for refusing advice from superiors to include vehicles in the mission (to be left at an emergency pickup point) which would have facilitated an easier exfiltration. Another SAS team used Land Rovers in this role when they also had to abandon a similar mission. However, it is also suggested that the patrol jointly agreed not to take vehicles because they felt they were too few in number and the vehicles too small (only short-wheelbase Land Rovers were available) to be of use and were ill-suited to a mission that was intended to be conducted from a fixed observation post.

=== Separation ===
During the night of 24/25 January, while McNab was trying to contact a passing Coalition aircraft using a TACBE communicator, the patrol inadvertently became separated into two groups. Whilst the others waited for a response on the TACBE, Phillips, Ryan and MacGown continued to move through the darkness. Neither of the two resultant groups followed the standard emergency rendezvous (ERV) procedure they had been trained to follow, and had followed the night before. Instead, both groups independently continued north towards the Syrian border.

After the separation, Phillips, Ryan and MacGown had two M16/M203 assault rifles and a Browning Hi-Power pistol among them, as well as at least one TACBE, and the night sight around Ryan's neck. McNab, Pring, Lane, Consiglio, and Coburn had their original weapons (three Minimis and two M16/M203s among them), as well as MacGown's Minimi (which McNab was carrying, but soon discarded). The larger group carried at least one TACBE, and the Magellan GPS.

According to Ryan, he was also carrying a 66 mm LAW rocket which he had struggled to free from his Bergen during the initial contact. According to McNab, however, the only item removed by Ryan from his Bergen was a silver hipflask, and it was McNab who was the only one carrying a 66 after this contact; he stated he left the 66 in the Bergen and was the only one to do so. Despite conflicting accounts, it is possible that Ryan may have in fact eventually ended up with McNab's LAW rocket, an item that Ryan later claimed to have used against an Iraqi "Land-Rover type" vehicle; this event is discounted by Ratcliffe who states that, at the Regimental debrief, "[Ryan] made no mention at all of encountering enemy troops on his trek."

=== Death of Phillips ===
On the evening of 25 January, Ryan, MacGown and Phillips left the tank berm they had stayed in during the day and headed north. Phillips was already suffering from hypothermia, and could no longer hold his M16/M203, which was handed to MacGown. As they continued, Phillips' condition worsened to the point where he mistook his black gloves for the colour of his own hands, and began yelling out loud. Eventually, Phillips lost contact with the other two somewhere around 2000 hrs, and died a short time later. According to Ryan and MacGown, they both searched for Phillips for about twenty minutes before deciding to continue without him, while according to General Sir Peter de la Billière, only Ryan searched while MacGown waited. Ryan also indicated that he didn't know Phillips was necessarily dead when he wrote "I hoped to God that [Phillips] was doing the same. That he would find his way down" and later "there were still five to account for", though MacGown admitted he knew Phillips was dead at the time. According to the SAS regimental roll of honour, it states that Phillips died of exposure while evading capture in Iraq on 22 January 1991 at the age of 36.

=== Capture of MacGown ===
At about midday on 26 January, Ryan and MacGown were discovered by an "old" (according to MacGown) goat herder tending a flock of goats. After discussing possibly killing the man, MacGown decided to go with him to locate a vehicle, while Ryan decided it was not safe to do so and remained where he was under the agreement that MacGown would return by 1830 hrs. MacGown took with him Phillips' M16/M203, but left his belt kit, in order to not "cut such an aggressive figure". MacGown walked with the goat herder for about four hours, before encountering a group of men with a Toyota Landcruiser vehicle. According to Ryan, MacGown shot and killed an unarmed Arab as he ran towards the vehicle, followed by two more armed with AK-47s. Without his belt kit, he had run out of ammunition, and was captured as he attempted to take the vehicle.

According to McNab's secondary account of these events, the old goat herder left MacGown with directions to a hut, where he found two vehicles. After killing a uniformed Iraqi soldier attempting to reach one of the vehicles, "six or seven" more came from the hut, three of whom were killed before MacGown's M16/M203 jammed, and he was captured as he sat in one of the vehicles. According to an interview given by MacGown in 2002, he came across the first soldier near a vehicle: "I brought up my trump card which was 'mohaba' and he said nothing, and I carried on talking and he then made a dash for the vehicle. I shot him in the head. A single shot." As more soldiers came out of the hut, MacGown aimed his rifle and fired but heard a click, indicating he was out of ammunition. It was apparent that Phillips had never reloaded the weapon after the initial contact on 24 January. For reasons unknown to MacGown, the soldiers did not return fire, but instead took him captive.

=== Hijack of vehicle by McNab's group ===
During the evening of 26 January, McNab's group of five stole a taxi at gun point by having Consiglio pretend to be wounded in McNab's arms whilst lying on the side of a road. When the car approached, Pring, Lane, and Coburn came up from behind cover and surrounded the vehicle. According to McNab's account, the group evicted all occupants from the taxi and drove until they reached a checkpoint, where Lane shot and killed one soldier, while the others in the group killed two more. According to Ryan's secondhand account, the group were driven to the checkpoint by one of the Iraqi occupants of the taxi. They exited the vehicle with plans to rendezvous on the other side of the checkpoint, but the driver alerted the police, and the group were forced to continue on foot. Asher's investigation, based on evidence from the actual driver of the car, supported Ryan's version of events with no reported armed contact and no reported Iraqi casualties.

=== Capture of McNab's group ===
On the morning of 27 January, McNab's group of five came into contact with local civilians and police. Consiglio was shot and killed by armed civilians at approximately 0200 hrs. Lane died of hypothermia later that same morning after swimming the Euphrates with Pring, who along with McNab and Coburn was subsequently captured. During an exchange of gunfire prior to capture, Coburn was shot in both the arm and ankle. According to an Iraqi policeman who was interviewed by Asher and who was involved in the firefight, the five-man SAS team was attacked by thirty armed Iraqis, some of whom were police and some who were armed civilians, but that contrary to McNab's account the SAS opened fire first. The firefight lasted about ten minutes and the Iraqis tried to encircle the SAS but when they moved in on their position, the SAS had disappeared. Later that night the same Iraqi policeman was part of a group of police who shot and captured Coburn. According to Asher, McNab's account of the firefights that took place later that night is the only account available to be relied on, but that the details concerning Coburn's capture are different to those given by the Iraqi policeman who was interviewed by Asher. McNab's account says that Cobrun was shot during an exchange of gunfire with the Iraqis but the police officer who was present at Coburn's capture says that Coburn was only armed with a bayonet at the time. This concurs with Coburn's later account which says that he was only armed with a knife when he was shot and captured because he had no more ammunition left for his Minimi which he had previously discarded.

According to McNab, the four captured patrol members (McNab, Pring, MacGown and the wounded Coburn) were moved numerous times, enduring torture and interrogation at each successive location. According to MacGown, however, "incidents such as teeth extraction and burning with a heated spoon did not happen. It is inconceivable that any such incidents could have occurred without them being discussed or being physically obvious." At the time of the release on 5 March of MacGown and Pring, they were described as "in good shape" by a Red Cross representative.

They were last held at Abu Ghraib Prison before their release.

=== Ryan's escape to Syria ===
Ryan claimed to have made SAS history with the "longest escape and evasion by an SAS trooper or any other soldier" to make it to Syria, covering 180 miles (290 km).

=== Medals awarded ===
Mitchell was awarded the Distinguished Conduct Medal for his actions during the mission, whilst Armstrong and two other patrol members (Steven Lane and Robert Consiglio), were awarded the Military Medal.

== Equipment ==
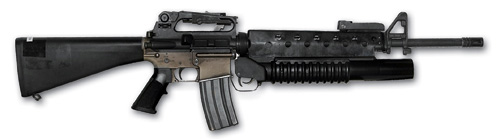
M16/M203 assault rifle

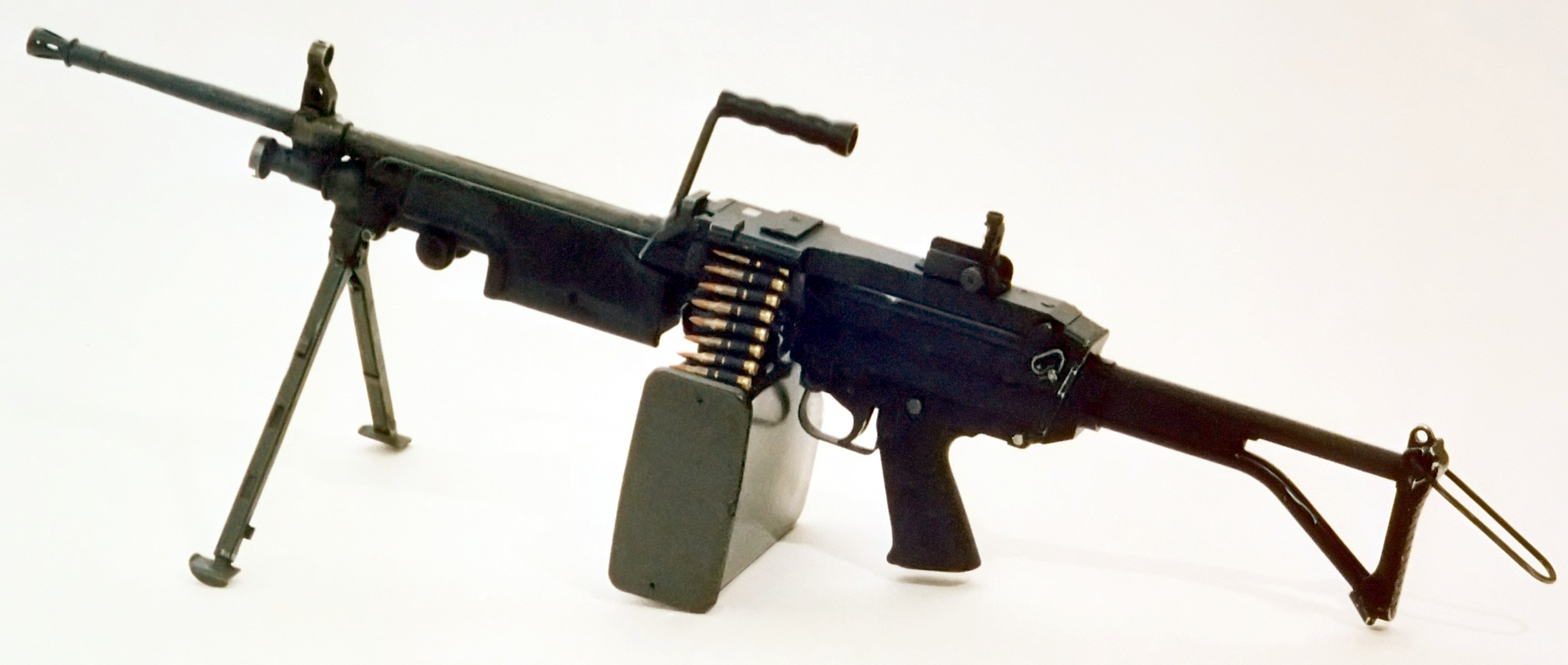
FN Minimi light support machine gun

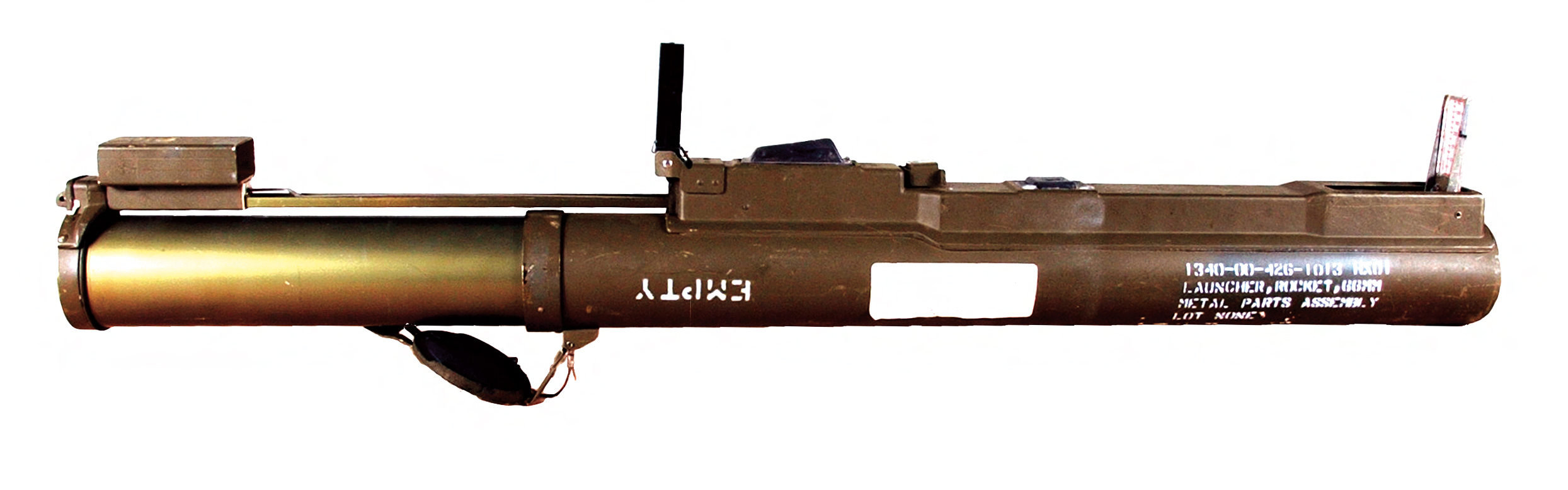
66 mm LAW rocket launcher

Each member of the patrol wore a two-shade desert DPM uniform with a World War II era sand-coloured desert smock. While the other members had regular issue army boots, Ryan (the only member to avoid eventual capture) wore a pair of £100 "brown Raichle Gore-Tex-lined walking boots."

Each member carried a belt kit, Bergen rucksack, one sandbag of food, one sandbag containing two NBC suits, extra ammunition bandoliers and a 5-imperial-gallon (6.0 U.S. gal; 23 L) jerry can of water. "The belt kit contained ammunition, water, food and trauma-care equipment." The rucksack contained 25 kilograms (3.9 st; 55 lb) of sandbags and observation post equipment, seven days worth of rations, spare batteries for the radio, demolition equipment (including PE4 plastic explosive, detonators, and both Claymore and Elsie anti-personnel mines), and intravenous drips and fluids for emergencies.

The patrol also had a PRC 319 HF patrol radio carried by Lane, four TACBE communication devices (carried by McNab, Ryan, and two others) to communicate with allied aircraft, a Magellan GPS carried by Coburn, and a KITE night sight carried by MacGown. The total weight of each member's kit was estimated at 95 kg (15.0 st; 209 lb) by McNab and 120 kg (19 st; 260 lb) by Ryan.

McNab, Phillips, Ryan, and Lane carried M16/M203 assault rifles, while Pring, Consiglio, MacGown, and Coburn carried FN Minimi light support machine guns. Each member carried a 66 mm LAW rocket on his back. Due to a missing shipment within the squadron, Phillips was the only member who carried a backup weapon, a Browning Hi-Power pistol.

== Literary accounts ==
- Storm Command, the autobiography of Lieutenant-General Peter de la Billière, who served as the commander of the British Forces during the Gulf War, was the first literary account of the patrol, although it was only mentioned in passing. The book was released in 1992.
- Patrol commander Steven Mitchell wrote an account of the patrol in a book titled Bravo Two Zero (ISBN 0-440-21880-2) under the pseudonym Andy McNab. Mitchell used pseudonyms and nicknames for the patrol members who survived, but controversially used the full names of those who died. The book was released in 1993.
- Colin Armstrong wrote The One That Got Away (ISBN 0-09-946015-7) under the pseudonym Chris Ryan. It criticized Mitchell's leadership of the patrol and was particularly hostile in tone to the conduct of Phillips. Armstrong used the same pseudonyms as McNab for those who survived, but also referred to Phillips, Lane and Consiglio by their real names. Ratcliffe said of this move that it was "insensitive" for Mitchell and Armstrong "to hide behind pseudonyms when they named their dead colleagues in their books, in deliberate contravention of the Regiment's traditions." The book was released in 1995.
- Peter Ratcliffe (The SAS's Regimental Sergeant Major at the time of the patrol) wrote Eye of the Storm (ISBN 1930983018), which refers to the controversy surrounding the differing accounts of the patrol in some detail. The book was released in 2000.
- Both Mitchell's and Armstrong's earlier accounts were critiqued by SAS reserve veteran Michael Asher in The Real Bravo Two Zero (ISBN 0-304-36554-8). In 2001, Asher followed the original path of the patrol, interviewing local Iraqis who witnessed the events. The book was released in 2002.
- The Gulf War Chronicles (ISBN 0595296696) by Richard Lowry recounted much of the patrol's story, though appeared to borrow heavily from the earlier story published by Mitchell. The book was released in 2003, aiming to "set the story straight".
- A third member of the patrol wrote Soldier Five: The Real Truth about the Bravo Two Zero Mission (ISBN 1-84018-907-X) under the pseudonym Mike Coburn, which more forcefully contradicted the previous accounts. The account also levelled damning accusations against the army, and the Ministry of Defence went to great lengths to attempt to prevent its publication, which they failed to do, although they were granted all of the book's profits. The book was released in 2004.
- Will Fowler writes of the patrol over a number of pages in SAS Behind Enemy Lines: Covert Operations 1941-2005 (ISBN 0-00-719990-2). He named the patrol commander as Sergeant ″Philip ′Mitch′ Mitchell″, whilst naming the other members as per previous literary accounts.
- Damien Lewis with fellow B Squadron SAS member Des Powell wrote SAS Bravo Three Zero (ISBN 1529414164) in 2021 and talk a lot about the planning phase of the three Bravo patrols as well as the members of Bravo Two Zero as well as Peter Ratcliffe.

== Dramatic and documentary accounts ==
- ITV produced a one-off dramatic version of Armstrong's book, also titled The One That Got Away, in 1996. The film starred Paul McGann as Ryan and was directed by Paul Greengrass.
- The BBC produced a two-part adaptation of Mitchell's book, also titled Bravo Two Zero, in 1998. It starred Sean Bean as McNab and was directed by Tom Clegg. In addition to using all of Mitchell's characters' pseudonyms, the names of the three deceased patrol members, Phillips, Consiglio and Lane were also changed for the film.
- In 2002, Channel 4 aired Asher's documentary (which accompanied his book), also titled The Real Bravo Two Zero, directed and produced by Gavin Searle.
- Also in 2002, the BBC's Panorama series released a documentary titled "A Question of Betrayal" featuring both Coburn and MacGowan, alleging that the patrol's distress calls had been received and ignored.
- In 2003, the television series JAG ran an episode ("The One That Got Away", S9, EP04) loosely based on the story of Bravo Two Zero involving US Marines Force Recon in Iraq. The name of the team that was involved was Bravo Two One.
- The video game I.G.I.-2: Covert Strike had "Chris Ryan" as a consultant for game development.
- No Man Left Behind episode "The One That Got Away" is focused on Bravo Two Zero.
