= Returned to unit =

Returned To Unit or RTU refers to a military member being returned to their home base or home unit, either due to their being medically unfit, their requesting to be withdrawn from training, or their being unfit for training or otherwise disorderly. As military members can only be court-martialed at their home base or unit, being RTU'd for misconduct can often be a precursor to further judicial punishment.

RTU'ing is a concept used during a period of specialist training, whereby a service person has been extracted or detached from their home unit. For example, if a service person has been extracted to complete an instruction course run by a specialist unit within the armed forces such as a PTI or Range Control course. In the event of the service person wishing to withdraw from the course (e.g. for personal or medical reasons); or if the course supervisors deem that the service person is unfit to complete the course, for either medical or disciplinary reasons, the service person may be returned to their home unit. If a candidate is RTU'd, the supervisor responsible for sending them home will supply a written report to the service person's OC detailing the reason why they have been RTU'd. If a service person is RTU'd on disciplinary grounds, their OC will decide if any further disciplinary action is needed, based on the RTU report from the course supervisor, and if necessary, by consultation with the course supervisors. The reason this is done is that, according to military law, disciplinary action such as a court-martial can only by issued against a service person by their home unit.

There are several reasons why a military member may be RTU'd. It can be for major or minor infractions of the rules, or disorderly behaviour. It may also be on compassionate grounds, such as RTU'ing an injured soldier (or other medical conditions).

The term Returned To Unit (RTU) is used in the Canadian Forces and the UK.

== See also ==
- Military discipline
- List of established military terms
