= Peter Ratcliffe =

British Army officer (born 1951)

- Born: 1951 (age 74–75); Salford, Greater Manchester, England
- Military career
- Allegiance: United Kingdom
- Branch: British Army
- Service years: 1970–1997
- Rank: Major
- Nickname: Billy
- Units: Special Air Service; Parachute Regiment
- Conflicts: Operation Banner; Dhofar Rebellion; Falklands War; Gulf War
- Awards: Distinguished Conduct Medal; Mentioned in Despatches
- Other work: Author

Major Peter Ratcliffe, DCM (born 1951) is a former British Army soldier and commissioned officer who served in the Parachute Regiment and the Special Air Service in a career of almost thirty years, during which he was awarded the Distinguished Conduct Medal for gallantry in action during the Gulf War. He is the author of the book The Eye of the Storm (2000).

== Early life ==
Ratcliffe was born in 1951 and spent his childhood years in Salford, Greater Manchester, where as a teenager he was an apprenticed plasterer.

== Military career ==
Ratcliffe joined the British Army's Parachute Regiment in January 1970 as private 24180996. He served with the 1st Battalion Parachute Regiment on Operation Banner in Northern Ireland in 1971–72, before transferring to the Special Air Service Regiment in 1972. He was attached to the 22 SAS, seeing service with its 18 (Mobility) Troop, 'D' Squadron.

During his time in the SAS he saw active service in a number of conflicts, including the Dhofar Rebellion in Oman, The Troubles, the Falklands War, for which on 8 October 1982 he was Mentioned in Dispatches, and Operation Granby in the Gulf War.

During the latter conflict, Ratcliffe was the Regimental Sergeant Major of 22 SAS, and received an order to assume command of its 'A' Squadron in a highly unusual circumstance of a non-commissioned officer replacing an officer in a command position. He subsequently led the squadron on a raid behind enemy lines against an Iraqi Army communications facility code-named by the British "Victor Two", for which he was afterwards awarded the Distinguished Conduct Medal for gallantry in action.

Ratcliffe received a commission in 1992, and was promoted to captain in 1994. After completing his career as a training officer with 23 Special Air Service Regiment, he retired from the British Army after almost thirty years' service with the rank of major in 1997.

== Post-military activities ==
Ratcliffe published a memoir of his military career entitled Eye of the Storm in 2000. He has been critical of other published works by former SAS personnel, specifically "Andy McNab" and "Chris Ryan", claiming that they have damaged the reputation of the regiment by fabricating elements of their war experiences in published works for monetary gain.

Ratcliffe has also publicly voiced concern about the provision of post traumatic stress support by the British Government to former soldiers of the British Army, following a number of high-profile suicides by former SAS soldiers after their military service careers.

== Publications ==
- Eye of the Storm: 25 Years in Action with the SAS (2000).
- The Little Book of the SAS (2001).
