= Physical training instructor =

Instructor in physical fitness

Physical training instructor (PTI) is a term used for an instructor in physical fitness, primarily in the British Armed Forces and British police, as well as some other countries in the Commonwealth and elsewhere.

== United Kingdom ==
Branch badge of a physical trainer in the Royal Navy

In the British Army, specialist physical training instructors (PTIs) of the Royal Army Physical Training Corps are attached to individual units to oversee physical training and manage military gymnasiums. They are assisted by all arm physical training instructors (AAPTIs), previously known as assistant physical training instructors (APTIs), who have other jobs within their unit as well as being qualified, but not specialist, physical training instructors. The PTI badge consists of crossed swords.

Physical training instructors in the Royal Navy are officially titled physical trainers and are known as "club swingers" or "clubs" from the crossed clubs they wear as a rate badge. In the Royal Air Force, the PTI badge consists of crossed swords with an eagle in the centre.

== New Zealand ==
The New Zealand Defence Force also employs physical training instructors who bear the same symbols as their British counterparts. The New Zealand Army Physical Training Corps wear the crossed swords, Royal New Zealand Navy PTIs wear the crossed clubs, and Royal New Zealand Air Force PTIs wear the clubs and arms.

In March 2016, all Navy, Army and Air Force physical training instructors were amalgamated into the new NZDF tri-service unit known as the Joint Operational Health Group.

NZDF PTIs use the motto Mens Sana In Corpore Sano, which roughly translates as "a healthy mind in a healthy body".

== Argentina ==
The Argentine Army has a Physical Training Service, made up of PT teachers graduated from civilian schools, who join the army as commissioned officers following a short course at the Military Academy. Each combat unit is supposed to have a PT officer, who reports to the operations officer (S-3). In larger units, such as academies and schools, they are complemented by civilian teachers. The Argentine Navy and Air Force rely on hired civilian teachers for their physical training instead.

== See also ==
- Annual Fitness Test
- Personal trainer
