= Annual Fitness Test =

British Army fitness test

In the British Army, the Annual Fitness Test is designed to assess soldiers' lower and upper body strength and endurance. The test was formerly known as the Combat Fitness Test – and is still colloquially known by soldiers as the CFT. The test involves a fast-paced march at fifteen minutes per mile (brisk and uncomfortable walking pace), in full combat gear including the SA80 personal weapon, across rough terrain and on roads. The exact weight of the equipment carried depends upon the type of unit and it is usually (including helmet, webbing & rifle) 15 kg to 25 kg dependent on service or arm, but all will cover a distance of 8 miles in less than 2 hours.

Typically, British Army Infantry units will carry the most weight (25 kg). Combat Support Arms, Royal Engineers, Royal Signals, and Royal Artillery) carry a lower amount of weight (20 kg). Combat Service Support Arms such as the Army Medical Services, Royal Logistic Corps, Royal Electrical and Mechanical Engineers and Adjutant General's Corps carry (15 kg). Female soldiers carry the same weight as their male counterparts. Weight is determined by the Arm a soldier is in so a clerk in an Infantry unit should carry 15 kg for their AFT.

The Annual Fitness Test, together with the Personal Fitness Assessment (mile and a half run, press ups and sit ups) are formalized in the British Army's Military Training Test as MATT 2. The Annual Fitness Test is the same regardless of sex – all personnel have the same test regardless of age or sex, whilst the Personal Fitness Assessment is gender adjusted – service personnel have to reach a minimum standard in accordance with age group and gender – older personnel and women get more time and lower minimums. Tables for the PFA are below.

.

Press-ups	Age															
	<30		30-34		35-39		40-44		45-49		50-54		55-59		60-64	
Gender/Category	M	F	M	F	M	F	M	F	M	F	M	F	M	F	M	F
Green	44	21	41	19	39	16	35	15	29	13	25	11	21	9	17	7
Amber	43-34	20-13	40-31	18-11	38-29	15-10	34-26	14-9	28-21	12-7	24-16	10-6	20-13	8-4	16-9	6-2
Red	33	12	30	10	28	9	25	8	20	6	15	5	12	3	8	1

Sit-ups	Age							
	<30	30-34	35-39	40-44	45-49	50-54	55-59	60-64
Gender/Category	M/F	M/F	M/F	M/F	M/F	M/F	M/F	M/F
Green	50	46	43	37	34	32	27	23
Amber	49-40	45-38	42-33	36-27	33-26	31-23	26-17	22-13
Red	39	37	32	26	25	22	16	12

Run	Age															
	<30		30-34		35-39		40-44		45-49		50-54		55-59		60-64	
Gender/Category	M	F	M	F	M	F	M	F	M	F	M	F	M	F	M	F
Green	10:30	13:00	11:00	13:30	11:30	14:00	12:00	14:30	12:30	15:00	13:30	16:00	14:10	16:40	14:40	17:10
Amber	10:31-11:15	13:01-14:00	11:01-11:50	13:31-14:30	11:31-12:20	14:01-15:00	12:01-12:55	14:31-15:30	12:31-13:30	15:01-16:00	13:31-14:40	16:01-17:05	14:11-15:23	16:41-17:43	14:41-15:58	17:11-18:16
Red	11:16	14:01	11:51	14:31	12:21	15:01	12:56	15:31	13:31	16:01	14:41	17:06	15:30	17:49	16:06	18:23

As from 2020/2021 a new set of fitness tests, the Role Fitness Test, have been introduced, which cover a broader range of physical performance but have the disadvantage of requiring equipment such as a hex bar for deadlifts, a pull up bar for pull ups, power-bags to lift and carry, and weighted bag (simulating a casualty) to drag. Unlike the PFA which could be done en-masse, with many parts the new tests takes more time and has the soldiers standing around waiting testing. Even the loaded march has been made more complicated with the first part being a 4km march with weight (Royal Engineers carry 40kg), and then the next part a 2km best effort (RE carry 25kg). All of the test are the same regardless of sex, and have been 'scientifically' devised.

== See also ==
- Physical training instructor
