= The One That Got Away (1996 film) =

1996 British TV film

- DVD cover art
- Based on: The One That Got Away by Chris Ryan
- Screenplay by: Paul Greengrass
- Directed by: Paul Greengrass
- Starring: Paul McGann; Nick Brimble; Simon Burke
- Music by: Barrington Pheloung
- Country of origin: United Kingdom
- Original language: English

Production
- Producer: Jeff Pope
- Cinematography: Ivan Strasburg
- Editor: Clive Maltby
- Running time: 111 minutes
- Production company: London Weekend Television

Original release
- Network: ITV
- Release: February 18, 1996

The One That Got Away is a 1996 ITV television film directed by Paul Greengrass and starring Paul McGann. It is based on the 1995 book of the same name by Chris Ryan telling the true story of a Special Air Service patrol during the Gulf War in 1991.

== Plot ==
Special Air Service patrol Bravo Two Zero is inserted into Iraq by helicopter to locate and destroy Iraqi Scud missile launchers. En route they find an unexpected group of Bedouin tribesmen and hide until they are noticed by a shepherd and exchange fire with armed fighters. They escape and return to the initial landing point but there is no helicopter waiting for them. While attempting to make contact, the patrol accidentally splits into a group of five soldiers heading to the road to hijack a vehicle and a group of three soldiers heading through the desert. Several days of travel later, seven of the soldiers have either died of hypothermia, been killed or been captured. Corporal Ryan journeys 180 miles to the Syrian border to escape.
