= Special Air Service =

Special forces unit of the British Army

- Special Air Service insignia
- Active: 1941–1945; 1947–present
- Country: United Kingdom
- Branch: British Army
- Type: Special forces
- Role: Special operations Counter-terrorism
- Size: Three regiments (Note: On 31 July 1947, the 21st regiment, SAS Regiment, (Artists Rifles) (Territorial Army) was formed. This was followed on 16 July 1952, when the 22 SAS Regiment was formed and the 23 Special Air Service Regiment (Territorial Army) was formed in February 1958. The 21 and 23 SAS are a part of the Army Reserve.)
- Part of: United Kingdom Special Forces
- Garrison/HQ: RHQ: Stirling Lines, Herefordshire, England; 21 SAS: Regent's Park Barracks, London, England; 22 SAS: Stirling Lines, Herefordshire, England; 23 SAS: Birmingham, West Midlands, England
- Nickname: "The Regiment"
- Motto: "Who Dares Wins"
- Colours: Pompadour blue
- March: Quick: "Marche des Parachutistes Belges"; Slow: "Lili Marlene"
- Engagements: List of SAS operations

Commanders
- Notable commanders: General Sir Peter de la Billière; General Sir Mark Carleton-Smith; Field Marshal The Lord Guthrie

The Special Air Service (SAS) is a special forces unit of the British Army. It was founded as a regiment in 1941 by David Stirling, and in 1950 it was reconstituted as a corps. The unit specialises in a number of roles including counter-terrorism, hostage rescue, direct action and special reconnaissance. Much of the information about the SAS is highly classified, and the unit is not commented on by either the British government or the Ministry of Defence due to the secrecy and sensitivity of its operations.

The corps consists of the 22 Special Air Service Regiment, which is the regular component, as well as the 21 Special Air Service Regiment (Artists) (Reserve) and the 23 Special Air Service Regiment (Reserve), which are reserve units, all under the operational command of United Kingdom Special Forces (UKSF). Its sister unit is the Royal Navy's Special Boat Service, which specialises in maritime counter-terrorism. Both units are under the operational control of the Director Special Forces.

The Special Air Service traces its origins to 1941 during the Second World War. It was reformed as part of the Territorial Army in 1947, named the 21st Special Air Service Regiment (Artists Rifles). The 22nd Special Air Service Regiment, which is part of the regular army, gained fame and recognition worldwide after its televised rescue of all but two of the hostages held during the 1980 Iranian Embassy siege.

== History ==
=== Second World War ===
The Special Air Service was a unit of the British Army during the Second World War that was formed in July 1941 by David Stirling and originally called "L" Detachment, Special Air Service Brigade – the "L" designation and Air Service name being a tie-in to a British disinformation campaign, trying to deceive the Axis into thinking there was a paratrooper regiment with numerous units operating in the area (the real SAS would "prove" to the Axis that the fake one existed). It was conceived as a commando force to operate behind enemy lines in the North African Campaign and initially consisted of five officers and 60 other ranks. Its first mission, in November 1941, was a parachute drop in support of the Operation Crusader offensive, codenamed Operation Squatter. Due to German resistance and adverse weather conditions, the mission was a disaster, with only 22 men, a third of the unit, making it back to base. The rest were either killed or captured. Its second mission was a major success. Transported by the Long Range Desert Group, it attacked three airfields in Libya, destroying 60 aircraft without loss. In September 1942, it was renamed 1st SAS, consisting at that time of four British squadrons, one Free French, one Greek, and the Folboat Section.

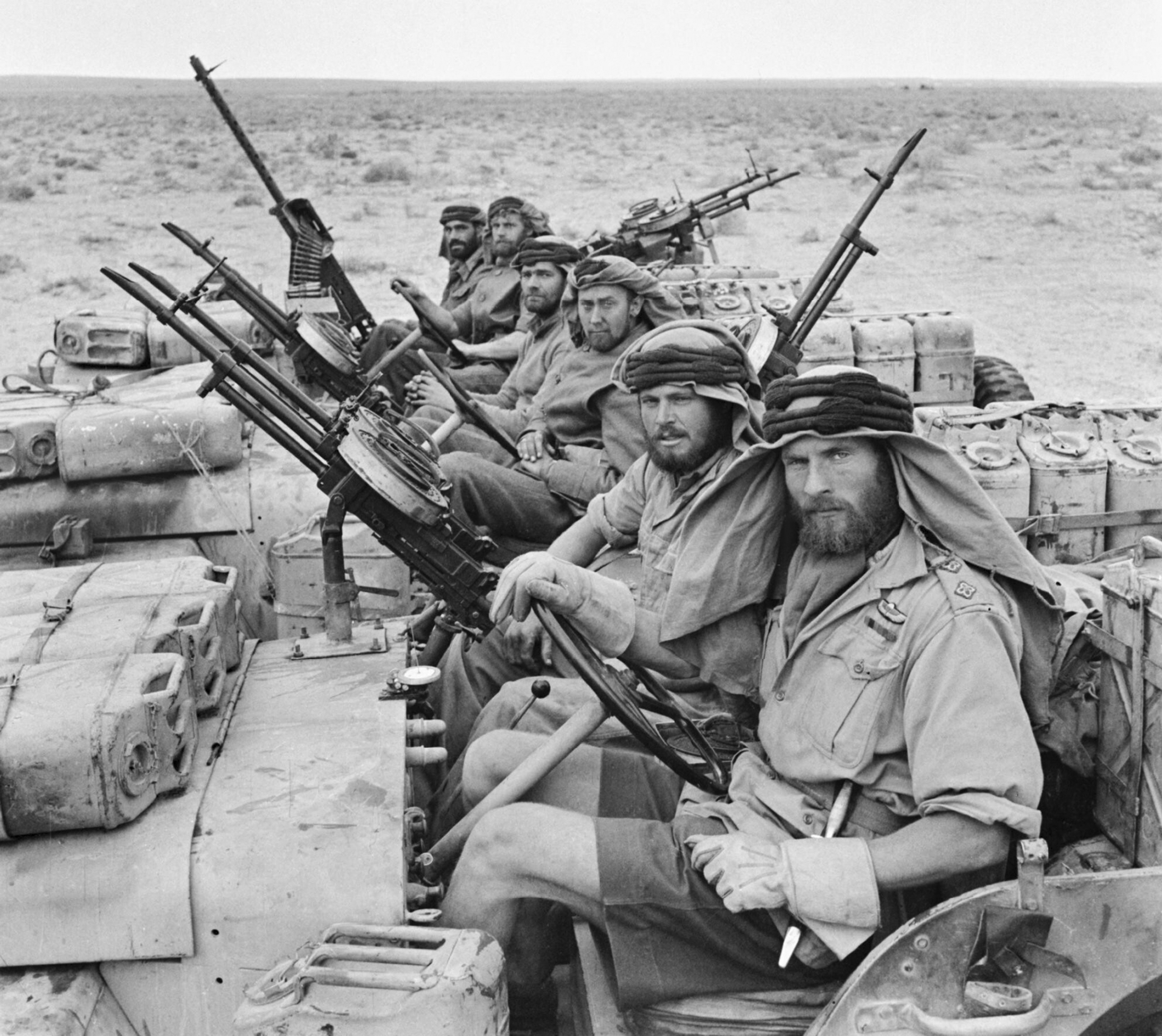
SAS patrol in North Africa during WWII (1943)

In January 1943, Colonel David Stirling was captured in Tunisia and Paddy Mayne replaced him as commander. In April 1943, the 1st SAS was reorganised into the Special Raiding Squadron under Mayne's command and the Special Boat Section was placed under the command of George Jellicoe. The Special Raiding Squadron fought in Sicily and Italy along with the 2nd SAS, which had been formed in North Africa in 1943 in part by the renaming of the Small Scale Raiding Force under the command of Bill Stirling (brother of David). The Special Boat Squadron fought in the Aegean Islands and Dodecanese until the end of the war. In 1944 the SAS Brigade was formed. The unit was formed from:

- 1st Special Air Service
- 2nd Special Air Service
- 3rd Special Air Service – 3^{e} Régiment de Chasseurs Parachutistes
- 4th Special Air Service – 2^{e} Régiment de Chasseurs Parachutistes
- 5th Special Air Service – lineage continued by Belgian Special Forces Group
- F Squadron – responsible for signals and communications

It was tasked with parachute operations behind the German lines in France and carried out operations supporting the Allied advance through France (Operations Houndsworth, Bulbasket, Loyton, Kipling and Wallace-Hardy), Belgium, the Netherlands (Operation Pegasus), and eventually into Germany (Operation Archway and Operation Howard). As a result of Hitler's issuing of the Commando Order on 18 October 1942, the members of the unit faced the additional danger that they would be summarily executed if captured by the Germans. In July 1944, following Operation Bulbasket, 34 captured SAS commandos were indeed summarily executed by the Germans; in October 1944, in the aftermath of Operation Loyton, another 31 captured SAS commandos were summarily executed by the Germans.

The last original member of the Special Air Service and the last survivor of the Long Range Desert Group, Mike Sadler, died on 4 January 2024, at the age of 103.

=== Post-war ===
At the end of the war the British government saw no further need for the force and disbanded it on 8 October 1945.

The following year it was decided there was a need for a long-term deep-penetration commando unit and a new SAS regiment was to be raised as part of the Territorial Army. Ultimately, the Artists Rifles, raised in 1860 and headquartered at Dukes Road, Euston, took on the SAS mantle as 21st SAS Regiment (V) on 1 January 1947.

John Woodhouse was chosen to assist with establishing a reformed selection process for the SAS. The rigorous systems he assisted in developing over three years provided the basis of selection and training of the modern SAS.

==== Malayan Scouts ====
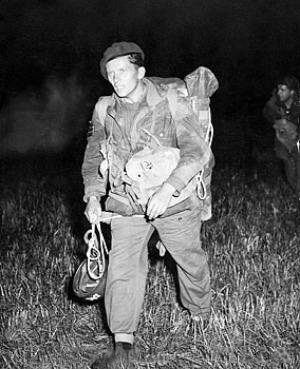
21 SAS soldier after a night parachute drop exercise in Denmark (1955)

In 1950, a 21 SAS squadron was raised to fight in the Korean War. After three months of training in Britain, it was informed that the squadron would no longer be required in Korea and so it instead volunteered to fight in the Malayan Emergency. Upon arrival in Malaya, it came under the command of Mike "Mad Mike" Calvert who was forming a new unit called the Malayan Scouts (SAS). Calvert had already formed one squadron from 100 volunteers in the Far East, which became A Squadron; the 21 SAS squadron then became B Squadron; and after a recruitment visit to Rhodesia by Calvert, C Squadron was formed from 100 Rhodesian volunteers. The Rhodesians returned home after three years' service and were replaced by a New Zealand squadron. By this time the need for a regular army SAS regiment had been recognised; the 22 SAS Regiment was formally added to the army list in 1952 and has been based at Hereford since 1960. In 1959 the third regiment, the 23 SAS Regiment, was formed by renaming the Reserve Reconnaissance Unit, which had succeeded MI9 and whose members were experts in escape and evasion.

=== 22 SAS Regiment ===
Since serving in Malaya, men from the regular army 22 SAS Regiment have taken part in reconnaissance patrols and large scale raiding missions in the Jebel Akhdar War in Oman and conducted covert reconnaissance and surveillance patrols and some larger scale raiding missions in Borneo during the Indonesia–Malaysia confrontation. They returned to Oman in operations against Communist-backed rebels in the Dhofar Rebellion including the Battle of Mirbat. They have also taken part in operations in the Aden Emergency, Northern Ireland, and Gambia. Their Special projects team assisted the West German counterterrorism group GSG 9 at Mogadishu, with Lufthansa Flight 181. The SAS counter terrorist wing famously took part in a hostage rescue operation during the Iranian Embassy Siege in London. SAS were involved throughout Britain's covert involvement in the Soviet–Afghan War; they acted through private military contractor Keenie Meenie Services (or KMS Ltd), training the Afghan Mujaheddin in weapons, tactics and using explosives. They trained the Mujaheddin in Afghanistan and sent them to be trained in Pakistan, Oman and parts of the UK. During the Falklands War B squadron were prepared for Operation Mikado before it was subsequently cancelled while D and G squadrons were deployed and participated in the raid on Pebble Island. Operation Flavius was a controversial operation in Gibraltar against the Provisional Irish Republican Army (PIRA). 22 SAS directed NATO aircraft onto Serb positions and hunted war criminals in Bosnia. They were involved in the Kosovo War helping KLA guerillas behind Serbian lines. According to Albanian sources one SAS sergeant was killed by Serbian special forces.

The Gulf War, in which A, B and D squadrons deployed, was the largest SAS mobilisation since the Second World War, also notable for the failure of the Bravo Two Zero mission. In Sierra Leone it took part in Operation Barras, a hostage rescue operation, to extract members of the Royal Irish Regiment.

Following the September 11 attacks on the United States by al-Qaeda in 2001, two squadrons of 22 SAS, later reinforced by members of both the Territorial SAS units, deployed to Afghanistan as part of the Coalition invasion at the start of the War in Afghanistan, to dismantle and destroy al-Qaeda and to deny it a safe base of operations in Afghanistan by removing the Taliban from power in the war on terror. The Regiment carried out Operation Trent, the largest operation in its history, which included its first wartime HALO parachute jump. Following the invasion, the Regiment continued to operate in Afghanistan against the Taliban and other insurgents until 2006, when its deployment to Iraq became its focus of operations, until 2009 when the SAS redeployed to Afghanistan.

The regiment took part in the Iraq War, notably carrying out operations in Iraq before the 2003 invasion. Following the invasion, it formed part of Task Force Black/Knight to combat the post invasion insurgency; in late 2005/early 2006, the SAS were integrated into JSOC and focused its counterinsurgency efforts on combating al-Qaeda in Iraq and the Sunni insurgency alongside Delta Force. The counter-insurgency was successful, and the UKSF mission in Iraq ended in May 2009. Overall, more than 3,500 terrorists were "taken off the streets" of Baghdad by 22 SAS.

Various British newspapers have speculated on SAS involvement in Operation Ellamy and the 2011 Libyan civil war. The Daily Telegraph reports that "defence sources have confirmed that the SAS has been in Libya for several weeks, and played a key role in coordinating the fall of Tripoli." While The Guardian reports "They have been acting as forward air controllers – directing pilots to targets – and communicating with NATO operational commanders. They have also been advising rebels on tactics."

Members of the Special Air Service were deployed to Northern Iraq in late August 2014, and according to former SIS chief Richard Barrett, would also be sent to Syria, tasked with trying to track down the Islamic State of Iraq and the Levant (ISIL) terrorist group that the press labelled the Beatles.

Since the 1990s SAS officers have risen to senior appointments in the British Armed Forces. General Peter de la Billière was the commander in chief of the British forces in the 1990 Gulf War. General Michael Rose became commander of the United Nations Protection Force in Bosnia in 1994. In 1997 General Charles Guthrie became Chief of the Defence Staff the head of the British armed forces. Lieutenant-General Cedric Delves was appointed commander of the Field Army and deputy commander in chief NATO Regional Headquarters Allied Forces North in 2002–2003.

=== 21 and 23 SAS ===
For much of the Cold War, the role of 21 SAS and 23 SAS was to provide stay-behind parties in the event of a Warsaw Pact invasion of western Europe, forming together I Corps' Corps Patrol Unit. In the case of an invasion, this Special Air Service Group would have let themselves be bypassed and remained behind in order to collect intelligence behind Warsaw Pact lines, conduct target acquisition, and thus try to slow the enemy's advance.

In early 2003, a squadron of about 60 soldiers from 21 SAS and 23 SAS, were deployed to Afghanistan. In 2005, for the first time since the Malayan Emergency a whole Reserve squadron deployed from one of the regiments to Afghanistan to conduct reconnaissance of Helmand province in preparation for the establishment of a Task Force based around 16 Air Assault Brigade.

=== Influence on other special forces ===
Following the post-war reconstitution of the Special Air Service, other countries in the Commonwealth recognised their need for similar units. The Canadian Special Air Service Company was formed in 1947, being disbanded in 1949. The New Zealand Special Air Service squadron was formed in June 1955 to serve with the British SAS in Malaya, which became a full regiment in 2011. Australia formed the 1st SAS Company in July 1957, which became a full regiment of the Special Air Service Regiment (SASR) in 1964. On its return from Malaya, the C (Rhodesian) Squadron formed the basis for creation of the Rhodesian Special Air Service in 1961. It retained the name "C Squadron (Rhodesian) Special Air Service" within the Rhodesian Security Forces until 1978, when it became 1 (Rhodesian) Special Air Service Regiment.

Non-Commonwealth countries have also formed units based on the SAS. The Belgian Army's Special Forces Group, which wears the same capbadge as the British SAS, traces its ancestry partly from the 5th Special Air Service of the Second World War. The French 1st Marine Infantry Parachute Regiment (1er RPIMa) can trace its origins to the Second World War 3rd and 4th SAS, adopting its "who dares wins" motto. The American unit, 1st Special Forces Operational Detachment-Delta, was formed by Colonel Charles Alvin Beckwith, who served with 22 SAS as an exchange officer, and recognised the need for a similar type of unit in the United States Army. The Israeli Sayeret Matkal and Shaldag units have also been modelled after the SAS, sharing its motto. Ireland's Army Ranger Wing (ARW) also trains with the SAS. The Philippine National Police's Special Action Force was formed along the lines of the SAS.

The former Royal Afghan Army's 666th Commando Brigade was formed by Colonel Rahmatullah Safi in the 1970s after he received his training with the SAS before it was disbanded through purges after the coups in 1973 and 1978.

=== Allegations of war crimes ===
==== Afghanistan ====
In December 2022, the British government announced that it planned to open the Independent Inquiry relating to Afghanistan to investigate extrajudicial killings that took place between 2010 and 2013, during the War in Afghanistan. This followed a detailed BBC Panorama investigation that found members of the SAS "repeatedly killed detainees and unarmed men in suspicious circumstances". Panorama spoke to witnesses who alleged that operatives justified the killings of unarmed persons by leaving weapons at the scenes of the shootings and that SAS squadrons competed '"with each other to get the most kills". According to the investigation, officers of the UK Special Forces were concerned over the number of reports of detainees being killed after reaching for hidden weapons. Allegedly, several raids ended with the deaths of more people than weapons recovered. The BBC visited the sites of some raids and heard from ballistics experts who interpreted the bullet patterns present as more indicative "of execution-style killings rather than firefights". A formal internal review was opened at the time, but evidence was never passed to military police.

The inquiry was launched in March 2023, to be chaired by Lord Justice Haddon-Cave.

In September 2024, an internal Ministry of Defence document written in 2019 was presented to the inquiry that concluded that the BBC Panorama allegations were "broadly accurate".

In late 2025, a former senior officer told the inquiry that British forces in Afghanistan executed suspects as well as unarmed civilians, including children, during operations and nothing was done despite widespread knowledge about the activities. On 1 December 2025, the officer, known as N1466, at the time the Assistant Chief of Staff for Operations in the UK Special Forces Headquarters, said that during a raid, SAS operatives shot at a mosquito net until there was no movement. He stated, "When the net was uncovered it was women and children. The incident was covered up and the individual who did the shooting was given some form of award to make it look legitimate."

N1466 also confirmed that evidence supporting allegations of war crimes was not passed to military police. In May 2026, the inquiry published a summary of the account of a former chief of staff, known as N2252. The officer explained to the inquiry in 2024 that the reason for the lack of referral – breaching every British military officer's "legal obligation to alert military police if they become aware that someone under their command may have committed a war crime" – was because it was believed that an investigation could disrupt operations and damage morale. An additional factor was that some of the evidence had originated from a rival special forces regiment.

==== Syria ====
In 2024 it was acknowledged that five SAS members were under investigation by the Defence Serious Crime Unit on suspicion of committing war crimes in Syria, though details were not disclosed by the Ministry of Defence.

== Organisation ==
Little publicly verifiable information exists on the contemporary SAS, as the British government usually does not comment on special forces matters due to the nature of their work. The Special Air Service comprises three units: one Regular and two Army Reserve (AR) units. The regular army unit is 22 SAS Regiment and the reserve units are 21 Special Air Service Regiment (Artists) (Reserve) (21 SAS(R)) and 23 Special Air Service Regiment (23 SAS (R)), collectively, the Special Air Service (Reserve) (SAS(R)).

Special Forces Parachute Support Squadron (Para Sp Sqn) is a sub-unit of the Airborne Delivery Wing (ADW) based at RAF Brize Norton.

Supplementary to the SAS, together with the Special Boat Service and the Special Reconnaissance Regiment is 18 (UKSF) Signal Regiment.

=== Squadrons ===
22 SAS normally has a strength of 400 to 600. The regiment has four operational squadrons: A, B, D and G. Each squadron consists of approximately 65 members commanded by a major, divided into four troops (each troop being commanded by a captain) and a small headquarters section. Troops usually consist of 16 members. Members of the SAS are variously known as "blade" or "operator". Each patrol within a troop consists of four members, with each member possessing a particular skill e.g. signals, demolition, medic or linguist in addition to basic skills learned during the course of his training. The term "squadron" dates back to the unit's earliest days when the unit's name was intended to confuse German intelligence. The four troops specialise in four different areas:

- Boat troop – specialists in maritime skills including diving using rebreathers, using kayaks (canoes) and rigid-hulled inflatable boats and often train with the Special Boat Service.
- Air troop – experts in free fall parachuting and high-altitude parachute operations including High-Altitude Low Opening (HALO) and High-Altitude High Opening (HAHO) techniques.
- Mobility troop – specialists in using vehicles and are experts in desert warfare. They are also trained in an advanced level of motor mechanics to field-repair any vehicular breakdown.
- Mountain troop – specialists in Arctic combat and survival, using specialist equipment such as skis, snowshoes and mountain climbing techniques.

In 1980 R Squadron (which has since been renamed L Detachment) was formed; its members are all ex-regular SAS regiment soldiers who have a commitment to reserve service. (Note: The Regular reserve is made up of ex-soldiers who have a mobilisation obligation by virtue of their former service in the regular army. For the most part, these reservists constitute a standby rather than ready reserve and are rarely mobilised except in times of national emergency or incipient war.)

22 SAS squadron duty rotations are set up as such that one squadron is maintained on Counter-Terrorism duty in the UK; a second will be on a deployment; a third will be preparing for deployment whilst conducting short term training; and the fourth will be preparing for long-term overseas training such as jungle or desert exercises. In times of war, such as the 2003 invasion of Iraq, it is not uncommon for two squadrons to be deployed.

22 Special Air Service Regiment	21 Special Air Service Regiment (Artists)	23 Special Air Service Regiment
'A' Squadron (Hereford)	'Cap' Squadron (Regent's Park)	'HQ' Squadron (Birmingham)
'B' Squadron	'A' Squadron (Regent's Park)	'B' Squadron (Leeds)
'D' Squadron	'C' Squadron (Bramley Camp)	'D' Squadron (Scotland)
'G' Squadron	'E' Squadron (Wales)	'G' Squadron (Manchester)

Squadron Structure:

- A Squadron: 1 (Boat) Troop – 2 (Air) Troop – 3 (Mobility) Troop – 4 (Mountain) Troop
- B Squadron: 6 (Boat) Troop – 7 (Air) Troop – 8 (Mobility) Troop – 9 (Mountain) Troop
- D Squadron: 16 (Air) Troop – 17 (Boat) Troop – 18 (Mobility) Troop – 19 (Mountain) Troop
- G Squadron: 21 (Mobility) Troop – 22 (Mountain) Troop – 23 (Boat) Troop – 24 (Air) Troop

=== Counter Terrorist Wing ===
The SAS has a subunit called the Counter Terrorist Wing (CTW) that fulfils its counterterrorism (CT) role. It has previously been known as the Counter Revolutionary Warfare (CRW) Wing and special projects team. The SAS receives aviation support from No. 658 Squadron AAC to carry out their CT role.

The CTW is trained in Close Quarter Battle (CQB), sniper techniques and specialises in hostage rescue in buildings or on public transport. The team was formed in the early 1970s after the Prime Minister, Edward Heath, asked the Ministry of Defence to prepare for any possible terrorist attack similar to the massacre at the 1972 Summer Olympics therefore ordering that the SAS Counter Revolutionary Warfare (CRW) wing be raised.

Squadrons refresh their training every 16 months, on average. The CRW's first deployment was during the Balcombe Street siege. The Metropolitan Police had trapped a PIRA unit; it surrendered when it heard on the BBC that the SAS were being sent in. The first documented action abroad by the CRW wing was assisting the West German counter-terrorism group GSG 9 at Mogadishu.

The CT role was shared amongst the squadrons, initially on a 12-month and later six-month rotation basis to ensure that all members are eventually trained in CT and CQB techniques. The SAS train for the CT role at Pontrilas Army Training Area in a facility that includes the Killing House (officially known as Close Quarter Battle House) and part of a Boeing 747 airliner that can be reconfigured to match the internal layouts of virtually any commercial aircraft. The on-call CT squadron is split into four troops, two of which are on immediate notice to move and are restricted to the Hereford-Credenhill area, whilst the other two conduct training and exercises across the UK, but are available for operational deployment should the need arise.

=== Commanding officers ===
- 1950 Lt Col Mike Calvert, Royal Engineers
- 1951 Lt Col John Sloane, Argyll and Sutherland Highlanders
- 1953 Lt Col Oliver Brooke, Welch Regiment
- 1954 Lt Col Michael Osborn, West Yorkshire Regiment
- 1955 Lt Col George Lea, Lancashire Fusiliers and Parachute Regiment
- 1957 Lt Col Tony Deane-Drummond, Royal Signals
- 1960 Lt Col Ronald Dare Wilson, Royal Northumberland Fusiliers
- 1962 Lt Col John Woodhouse, Dorset Regiment and East Surreys
- 1965 Lt Col Michael Wingate-Gray, Black Watch
- 1967 Lt Col John Slim, Argyll and Sutherland Highlanders
- 1969 Lt Col John Watts, Royal Irish Rangers
- 1972 Lt Col Peter de la Billière, Light Infantry
- 1974 Lt Col Anthony Jeapes, Devonshire and Dorset Regiment
- 1977 Lt Col Mike Wilkes, Royal Artillery
- 1982 Lt Col Mike Rose, Coldstream Guards
- 1984 Lt Col Andrew Massey, Royal Corps of Transport
- 1986 Lt Col Cedric Delves, Devonshire and Dorset Regiment
- 1989 Lt Col John Holmes, Scots Guards
- n/k Lt Col Jonathan "Jacko" Page, Parachute Regiment
- 2001 Lt Col Ed Butler, Royal Green Jackets
- 2002 Lt Col Mark Carleton-Smith, Irish Guards
- 2007 Lt Col Richard Williams, Parachute Regiment
- 2012 Lt Col Nick Perry, King's Royal Hussars

=== Operational command ===
==== Regular ====
22 SAS is under the operational command of the Director Special Forces (DSF), a major-general grade post. Previously ranked as a brigadier, the DSF was promoted from brigadier to major-general in recognition of the significant expansion of the United Kingdom Special Forces (UKSF).

==== Reserve ====
On 1 September 2014, 21 and 23 SAS were moved from UKSF. They were placed under command of 1st Intelligence, Surveillance and Reconnaissance Brigade. In 2019 they were moved back to UKSF.

== Recruitment and training ==
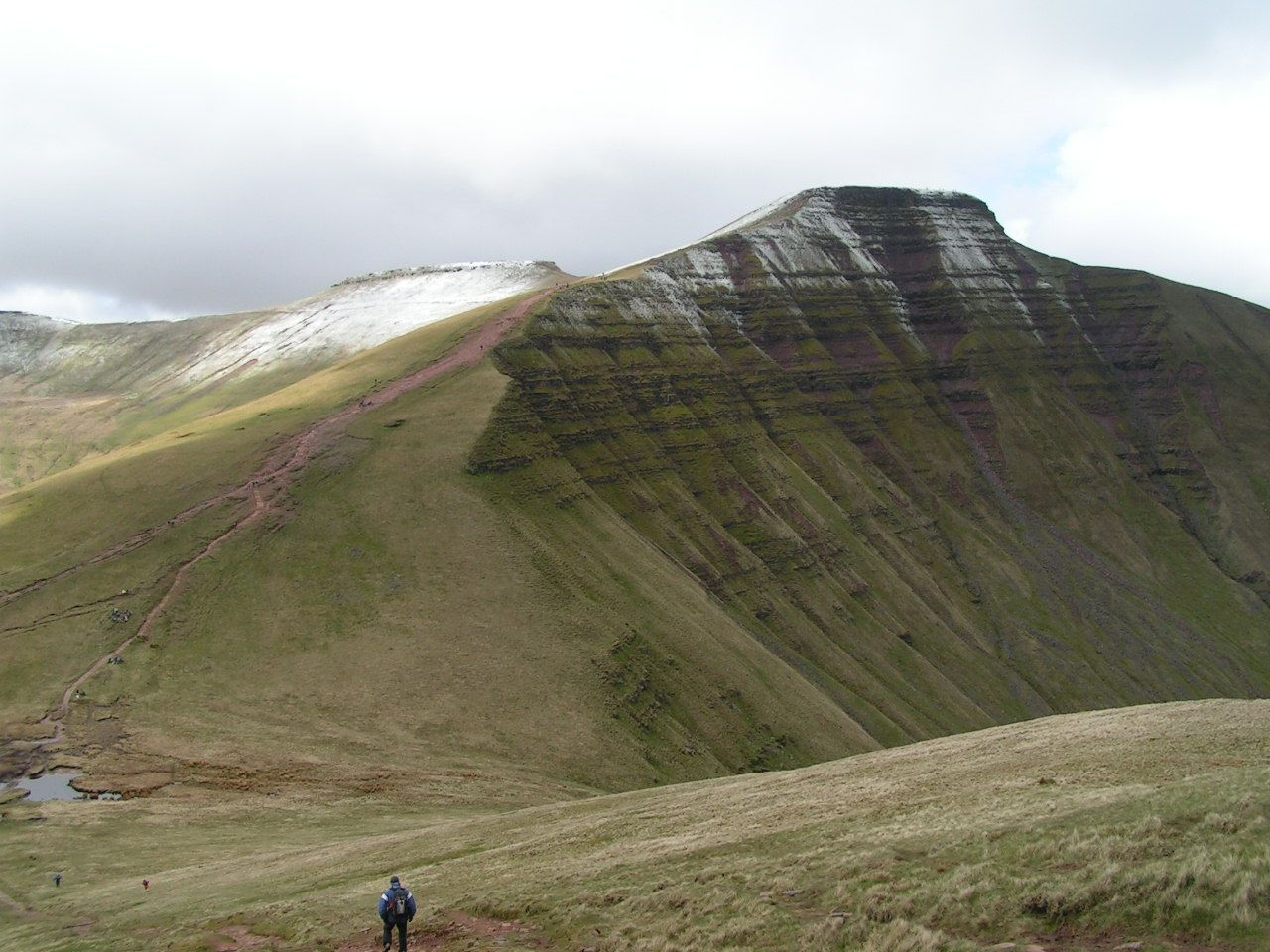
Pen y Fan 2,907 feet (886 m) above sea level, the location for the Fan Dance

The original SAS selection course was created by John Woodhouse in 1952. The United Kingdom Special Forces do not recruit directly from the general public. All current members of the UK Armed Forces can apply for Special Forces selection, but the majority of candidates have historically come from a Royal Marines or Parachute Regiment background. Selections are held twice a year, once in summer and again in winter.

Typically only 10% of candidates make it through the initial selection process. Between 2014 and 2022 there were more deaths in training and exercises than in combat against armed threats. In a group of approximately 200 candidates, most will drop out within the first few days, and fewer than 30 will remain by the end. Those who complete all phases of selection are transferred to an operational squadron.

For applicants to the reserve component, 21 SAS and 23 SAS, the pathway involves comparable elements, apart from jungle training, but taken in blocks, spread out over a longer period, to fit in with the demands of participants' civilian careers. In October 2018, recruitment policy changed to allow women to become members of the SAS for the first time. In August 2021, two women became the first to pass the pre-selection course, making them eligible for the full course.

The first phase of selection, aptitude phase, lasts 4 weeks and takes place in the Brecon Beacons. This phase also involves training in Sennybridge, and normally starts with approximately 200 potential candidates. Candidates complete a Personal Fitness Test (PFT) upon arrival, which consists of at least 50 sit-ups in two minutes, 60 press-ups in two minutes, and a 1.5-mile (2.4 km) run in 10 minutes and 30 seconds. They then complete an Annual Fitness Test (AFT), which consists of marching 8 miles (13 km) in two hours while carrying 25 lb (11 kg) of equipment. Candidates then march cross-country against the clock, increasing the distance covered each day; this culminates in an endurance test known as the "Endurance", in which candidates march 40 miles (64 km) with full equipment before climbing up and down the mountain Pen y Fan (886 m; 2,907 ft) in 20 hours. By the end of this phase, candidates must then be able to run 4 miles (6.4 km) in 30 minutes or less and swim 2 miles (3.2 km) in 90 minutes or less.

After completing aptitude phase, officer candidates are required to spend a week assessing their ability to carry out planning for UKSF operations while fatigued and stressed. Following mountain training, the jungle phase takes place in Belize, Brunei, or Malaysia. Candidates are taught navigation, patrol formation and movement, and jungle survival skills. Candidates then return to the UK to begin training in battle plans and foreign weapons, and then take part in combat survival exercises, ending in week-long escape and evasion training. Candidates are formed into patrols and, with nothing more than a tin can filled with survival equipment, are dressed in World War II-era uniforms and told to head for a particular destination by sunrise. The final selection test, resistance to interrogation (RTI), lasts for 36 hours.

== Uniform distinctions ==
SAS pattern parachute wings

Normal barracks headdress is the sand-coloured beret; its cap badge is a downward pointing Excalibur, wreathed in flames (often incorrectly referred to as a winged dagger) worked into the cloth of a Crusader shield with the motto Who Dares Wins. (Note: Designed by Bob Tait in 1941, it is a flaming sword, although it is often known as a winged dagger.) SAS pattern parachute wings, designed by Lieutenant Jock Lewes and based on the stylised sacred ibis of Isis of Egyptian iconography depicted in the décor of Shepheard's Hotel in Cairo, are worn on the right shoulder. Its ceremonial No 1 dress uniform is distinguished by a light-blue stripe on the trousers. Its stable belt is a shade of blue similar to the blue stripe on the No 1 dress uniform.

== Battle honours ==
In the British Army, battle honours are awarded to regiments that have seen active service in a significant engagement or campaign, generally with a victorious outcome. The Special Air Service Regiment has been awarded the following battle honours:

- North-West Europe 1944–45
- Tobruk 1941
- Benghazi Raid
- North Africa 1940–43
- Landing in Sicily
- Sicily 1943
- Termoli
- Valli di Comacchio
- Italy 1943–45
- Greece 1944–45
- Adriatic
- Middle East 1943–44
- Falkland Islands 1982
- Western Iraq
- Gulf 1991

== Order of precedence ==
Preceded by Line Infantry and Rifles	British Army Order of Precedence	Succeeded by Army Air Corps

== Memorials ==
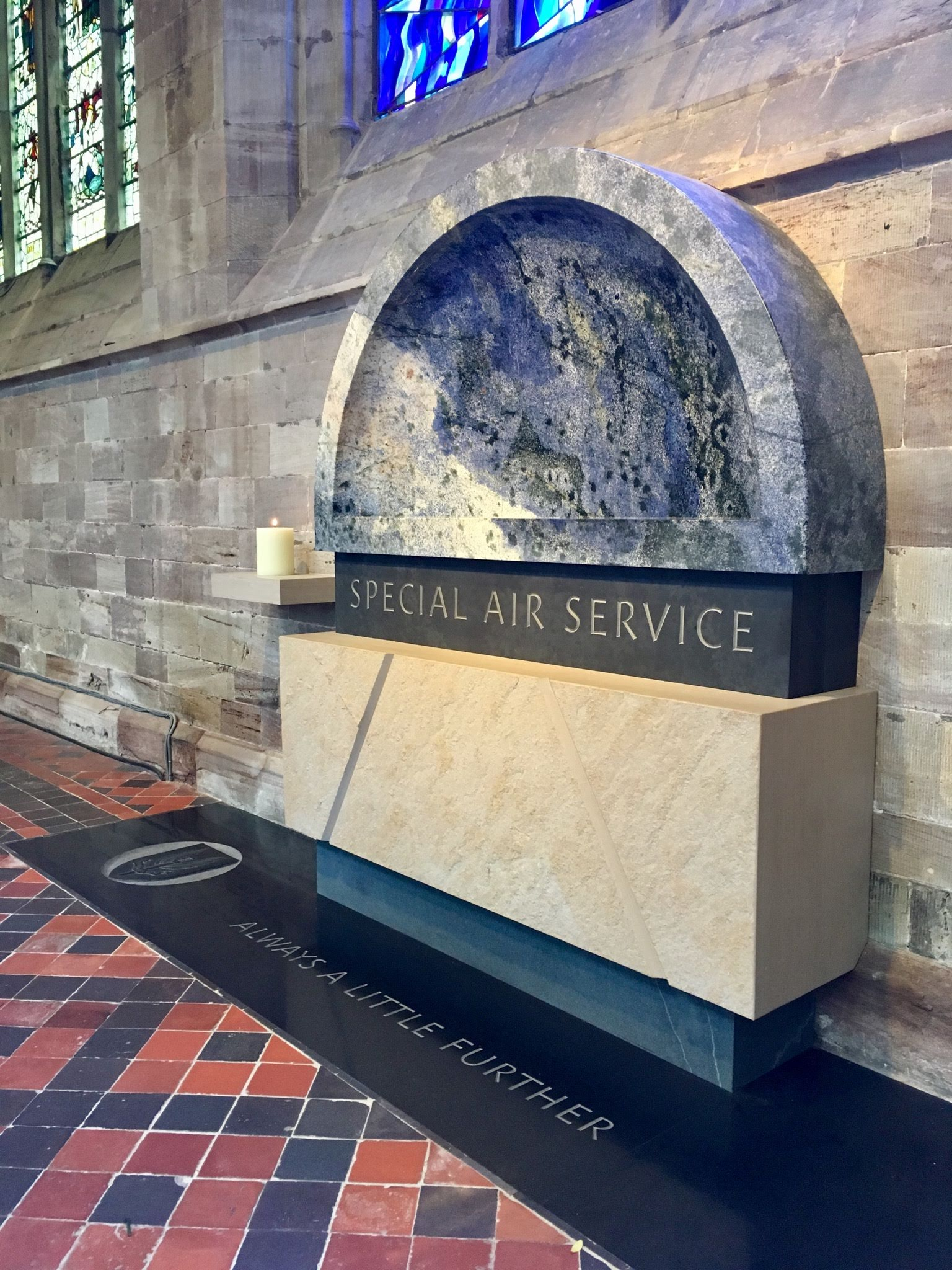
Ascension memorial at Hereford Cathedral

The names of those members of the Regular SAS who have died on duty were inscribed on the regimental clock tower at Stirling Lines. Originally funded by contributions of a day's pay by members of the regiment and a donation from Handley Page in memory of Cpl. R.K. Norry who was killed in a freefall parachuting accident, this was rebuilt at the new barracks at Credenhill. Those whose names are inscribed are said by surviving members to have "failed to beat the clock". At the suggestion of the then Commanding Officer, Dare Wilson, inscribed on the base of the clock is a verse from The Golden Journey to Samarkand by James Elroy Flecker:

We are the Pilgrims, master; we shall go
Always a little further: it may be
Beyond that last blue mountain barred with snow
Across that angry or that glimmering sea...

The other main memorial is the SAS and Airborne Forces memorial in the cloisters at Westminster Abbey. The SAS Brigade Memorial at Sennecey-le-Grand in France commemorates the wartime dead of the Belgian, British and French SAS and recently a memorial plaque was added to the David Stirling Memorial in Scotland. There are other smaller memorials "scattered throughout Europe and in the Far East".

The local church of St Martin's, Hereford has part of its graveyard set aside as an SAS memorial; over twenty SAS soldiers are buried there. There is also a wall of remembrance displaying memorial plaques to some who could not be buried, including the 18 SAS men who lost their lives in the Sea King helicopter crash during the Falklands Campaign on 19 May 1982 and a sculpture and stained glass window dedicated to the SAS.

On 17 October 2017 Ascension, a new sculpture and window honouring the Special Air Service Regiment in Hereford Cathedral, was dedicated by the Bishop of Hereford at a service attended by Prince William.

== In popular culture ==
Books and films about the SAS

- Eastern Approaches – Fitzroy Maclean's memoir provides his personal experiences in the fledgling SAS in the Western Desert Campaign.
- Bravo Two Zero – Memoir about a failed SAS mission by Andy McNab.
  - Bravo Two Zero – 1999 miniseries based on the book of the same name by Andy McNab.
- Red Notice – Novel by Andy McNab, part of his Tom Buckingham Series.
  - SAS: Red Notice – 2021 film based on the book of the same name by Andy McNab.
- The One That Got Away – Memoir about the Bravo Two Zero mission by Chris Ryan.
  - The One That Got Away – Film based on the book of the same name by Chris Ryan.
- The Feather Men – Novel by Sir Ranulph Fiennes, claimed by the author to be a partly non-fictional story involving the SAS.
  - Killer Elite – Film based on The Feathermen, about a mercenary hired to kill SAS troopers (fictional story surrounding real events and people from SAS history).
- 6 Days – Film about the SAS involvement in the Iranian Embassy siege in 1980.
- Who Dares Wins – 1982 film, released in the United States as The Final Option.
- SAS: Rogue Heroes – 2016 book.

Television shows about the SAS

- SAS: Are You Tough Enough? (2002–2004).
- SAS: Who Dares Wins – Quasi-military training television reality programme which pits contestants against harsh environments in a two-week-long training course designed to replicate Special Air Service selection.
- Ultimate Force – ITV action drama series following the operations of the fictitious "Red Troop" of the Special Air Service (2002–2008).
- SAS: Rogue Heroes – BBC historical drama series which depicts the formation of the Special Air Service during World War II (2022).

Video games featuring the SAS

== Alliances ==
- Australia – Special Air Service Regiment
- New Zealand – New Zealand Special Air Service

== See also ==
- List of military special forces units
- Parachute Regiment (United Kingdom)

== Bibliography ==
- Adams, James (1987). Secret Armies. Hutchinson. ISBN 0-553-28162-3.
- Breuer, William B. (2001). Daring missions of World War II. John Wiley and Sons. ISBN 978-0-471-40419-4.
- Chant, Christopher (1988). The Handbook of British Regiments. Routledge. ISBN 0-415-00241-9.
- Davis, Brian Leigh (1983). British Army Uniforms and Insignia of World War Two. Arms and Armour Press. ISBN 0-85368-609-2.
- Downie, Nick (2006). Passing the SAS Selection Course – from the Inside. h2g2. Archived from the original on 21 September 2021.
- de B. Taillon, J. Paul (2000). The evolution of Special Forces in Counter-Terrorism, The British and American Experiences. Greenwood. ISBN 0-275-96922-3.
- Edgeworth, Anthony; De St. Jorre, John (1981). The Guards. Ridge Press/Crown Publishers. ISBN 0-517-54376-1.
- Farrell, Theo (2017). Unwinnable: Britain's War in Afghanistan, 2001–2014. Bodley Head. ISBN 978-1847923462.
- Geraghty, Tony (1980). Who Dares Wins: The Story of the Special Air Service, 1950–1980. Book Club Association. ISBN 085368457X.
- Griffin, P.D (2006). Encyclopedia of Modern British Army Regiments. Sutton Publishing. ISBN 0-7509-3929-X.
- Fremont-Barnes, Gregory (2009). Who Dares Wins – The SAS and the Iranian Embassy Siege 1980. Osprey Publishing. ISBN 978-1-84603-395-7.
- Haskew, Michael E (2007). Encyclopaedia of Elite Forces in the Second World War. Pen and Sword. ISBN 978-1-84415-577-4.
- Jennings, Christian (2005). Midnight in some burning town: British Special Forces: Operations from Belgrade to Baghdad. Cassell. ISBN 0-3043-6708-7.
- Kemp, Anthony (1993). The SAS at War 1941–1945. Signet. ISBN 0451174569.
- Molinari, Andrea (2007). Desert Raiders: Axis and Allied Special Forces 1940–43. Osprey Publishing. ISBN 978-1-84603-006-2.
- Morgan, Mike (2000). Daggers Drawn: Second World War heroes of the SAS and SBS. Sutton. ISBN 0-7509-2509-4.
- Otway, Lieutenant-Colonel T.B.H. (1990). The Second World War 1939–1945 Army – Airborne Forces. Imperial War Museum. ISBN 0-901627-57-7.
- Ryan, Chris (2009). Fight to Win. Century. ISBN 978-1-84605-666-6.
- Scholey, Pete; Forsyth, Frederick (2008). Who Dares Wins: Special Forces Heroes of the SAS. Osprey Publishing. ISBN 978-1-84603-311-7.
- Shortt, James; McBride, Angus (1981). The Special Air Service. Osprey Publishing. ISBN 0-85045-396-8.
- Stevens, Gordon (2005). The Originals – The Secret History of the Birth of the SAS in Their Own Words. Ebury Press. ISBN 978-0-09-190177-6.
- Thompson, Leroy (1994). SAS: Great Britain's Elite Special Air Service. Zenith Imprint. ISBN 0-87938-940-0.
