= Western Morocco Arabic =

Arabic variety of western Morocco

Western Moroccan Arabic
- ʿAroubi Darija
- عروبي
- Native to: Morocco
- Language family: Afro-Asiatic: Semitic; West; Central; North Arabian; Arabic; Maghrebi; Hilalian; Moroccan; Western Moroccan Arabic
- Writing system: Arabic alphabet

Language codes
- ISO 639-3: –
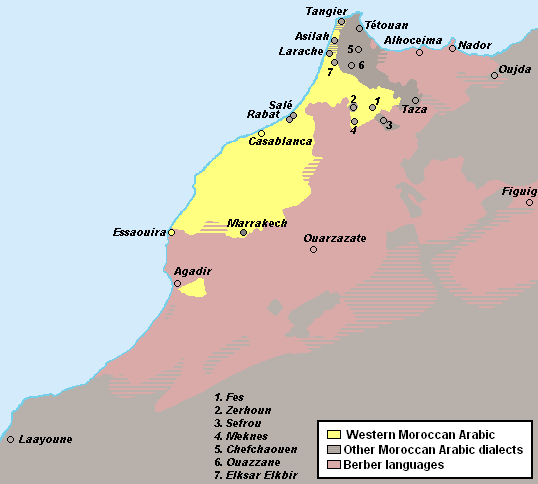
- Map showing Western Moroccan Arabic speaking areas (yellow)

Western Moroccan Arabic or ʿAroubi Darija (Arabic: عروبي, lit. 'rural, bedouin') is a dialectal continuum of Hilalian Arabic, mainly spoken in the western (Doukkala, Abda, Tadla, Chaouia, Rhamna, Sraghna, Chiadma and Zaër) and central-western (Saïss, Gharb and pre-Rif) plains of Morocco.

It can be divided into 3 regiolects: northern, central and southern.

== See also ==
- Hassaniya
- Jebli Arabic
- Eastern Morocco Arabic
