= Notes of a Moroccan Infidel =

Autobiographical book

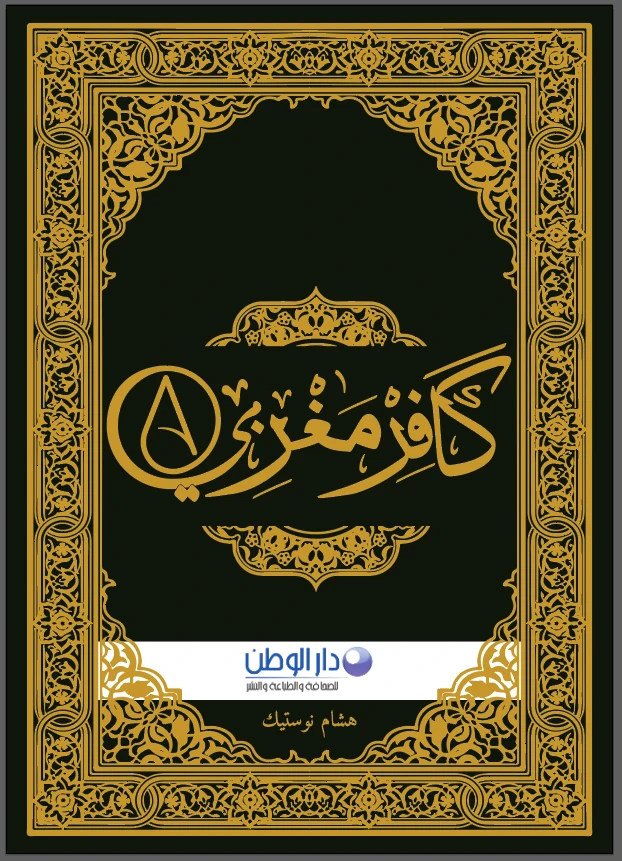
- cover of the second ed. 2020
- Author: Hicham Nostik
- Audio read by: Hicham Nostik
- Original title: مذكرات كافر مغربي
- Language: Moroccan Darija
- Subject: Autobiography, atheism, Islam
- Genre: Autobiography
- Publisher: Dar Al Watan
- Publication date: February 9, 2019
- Publication place: Morocco
- Pages: 170
- ISBN: 9789954648469

Notes of a Moroccan Infidel (original title: مذكرات كافر مغربي, also known as Memoirs of a Moroccan Infidel or Memories of Kafer Maghribi) is an autobiographical book of Moroccan atheist author Hicham Nostik, where he recounts his childhood in Morocco and life in Germany until he left Islam. It was a best-selling book in the 2019 and 2020 editions of the Casablanca Book Fair. All copies of the first edition (2019) were sold out within a few days.

The book was originally written in Moroccan Darija, published by Dar Al Watan publishing house, in 170 pages, but was also translated to French, with translations into other languages underway. The introduction of the Darija version was written by Moroccan intellectual Said Nachid. The author mentioned in an interview that he had to censor some passages from the book, so it would pass the approval process and be published in Morocco. He later announced that all his share of the profits from the book was donated to a charity.

== Reactions and reviews ==
The book was a commercial success in Morocco, and received mixed reactions from the Moroccan public, press and intellectuals between praise and attack.

The general theme of the book, a journey from Islam to atheism, is the main point that made it controversial. Some critics were opposed to its publication, because it would "spread atheism" in their opinion. Other critics considered that publishing such books is "acceptable" as a way to "listen to opposite views", to "study the phenomenon of atheism in Moroccan society", and "understand its psychological underpinnings" and the "pretexts for it used by atheists", which would be "useful for researchers" into these topics. It also "debunks the claims of persecution against those who leave Islam in Morocco, an Islamic country".

Al Ayyam newspaper, which interviewed the author, citing some of the most interesting passages from the book, wrote that the review "is not a call to atheism" but "an attempt to listen to a contrary point of view" since "Islam calls for accepting others even if we disagree with them". The paper also cited a study that estimated the percentage of non-believers in Morocco to 7%, and considered Hicham Nostik as one of if not "the most famous atheist in Morocco".

The French-Moroccan magazine Le360, in a review of the literary work of Nostik, praised the book, citing its use of the "delicious Moroccan language", and added that it is "funny", "it makes people think", and "is full of humanism". "It is an ode, not to atheism or agnosticism, but to humanism", it specified.

Tunisian writer Kamel Riahi in an article review of the book, praised its first half, and compared it to famous autobiographies in the Arabic-speaking world, such as For Bread Alone by Mohamed Choukri. The second half of the book though, in his opinion, was less original and authentic, and "repeated clichés about terrorists and their stories". Riahi added that, "despite its importance", this memoir is likely to be ignored by critics and academics, for two main reasons: its language which diverges from Standard Arabic, and would therefore limit its exposure mainly to non-academic Moroccan audience, and its title which "some may find repulsive and vulgar".

Moroccan sociologist and anthropologist Abdellah Charef opposed the exhibition of this book in the Casablanca Book Fair, and expressed the view that it "does not deserve to be there", since it "has nothing to do with intellect or culture", and "offends the Islamic beliefs of Moroccans". He criticized the Moroccan Ministry of Culture for not opposing the publication of such a book which tries to "destroy the underpinnings of Islam" in Moroccan society.
