= Irreligion in Morocco =

Irreligion in Morocco is relatively uncommon, in the country. While a 2015 poll of about 1000 Moroccans by Gallup International found that 4% of respondents said they were "not religious", and 1% reported being a "convinced atheist", while 93% said they were religious.

Another survey of about 2,400 Moroccans in 2018 by Arab Barometer found that 13% answered that they are "not religious", 44% said they are "somewhat religious", and 38% "religious" while 99.8% of those who were surveyed identified as Muslim, regardless of their level of religiosity.

== The situation of Moroccan nonbelievers ==
Article 220 of the Moroccan criminal code condemns "those who attempt to shake the faith of a Muslim" to up to 3 years in jail. However, there aren't many examples of this law being used for atheists in Morocco.

Kacem El Ghazzali is one of the publicly known Moroccan atheists. His writings stress the importance of freedom of thought which lacks in Islamic countries.

== Council of Ex-Muslims of Morocco ==
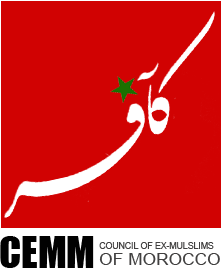
Council of Ex-Muslims of Morocco logo.

In 2013, the Council of Ex-Muslims in Morocco was founded by Imad Iddine Habib. It was the first public atheist and non-religious organisation in a country with Islam as its state religion. The goals of the council are:

- Universal rights and equal citizenship for all. The organisation is opposed to cultural relativism and the tolerance of inhuman beliefs, discrimination and abuse in the name of respecting religion or culture.
- Freedom to criticize religion. Prohibition of restrictions on unconditional freedom of criticism and expression using so-called religious 'sanctities'.
- Freedom of and from religion.
- Separation of religion from the state, legal and educational system.
- Prohibition of religious customs, rules, ceremonies or activities that are incompatible with or infringe people's rights and freedoms.
- Abolition of all restrictive and repressive cultural and religious customs which hinder and contradict woman's independence, free will and equality.
- Prohibition of segregation of sexes.
- Prohibition of interference by any authority, family members or relatives, or official authorities in the private lives of women and men and their personal, emotional and sexual relationships and sexuality.
- Protection of children from manipulation and abuse by religion and religious institutions.
- Prohibition of any kind of financial, material or moral support by the state or state institutions to religion and religious activities and institutions.
- Prohibition of all forms of religious intimidation and threats.

== Notable irreligious Moroccans ==
=== In Morocco ===
- Zineb El Rhazoui, co-founder of the Mali movement, and human rights activist.
- Ibtissam Lachgar, a feminist and LGBT advocate. Co-founder of the Mali Movement.

=== Diaspora ===
- Hassan Bahara, a Moroccan-Dutch writer.
- Hafid Bouazza, a Moroccan-Dutch writer.
- Hicham Nostik: Moroccan YouTuber and writer.
- Kacem El Ghazzali, a secularist writer, and human rights activist. He is one of the few Moroccans to publicly announce his atheism.
- Najat El Hachmi, a Moroccan writer.

== See also ==
- Religion in Morocco
- Christianity in Morocco
- Islam in Morocco
- Demographics of Morocco
