= Internal market (disambiguation) =

The Internal Market is the single market that exists among the member states of the European Union.

An internal market, single market, or common market is a type of trade bloc in which most trade barriers have been removed.

Internal market may also refer to:

- NHS internal market, a policy of competition in England's National Health Service
- United Kingdom Internal Market Act 2020, an act of the UK Parliament to prevent internal trade barriers and restrict the powers of the devolved administrations
- The Internal Market (novel), a 1997 biographical novel by Muhammad Shukri

== See also ==
- Common market (disambiguation)
- Relationship marketing#Internal marketing
