= Eastern Morocco Arabic =

Arabic dialect common in eastern Morocco

- Oujda Darija
- Native to: Morocco
- Language family: Afro-Asiatic: Semitic; West Semitic; Central Semitic; North Arabian; Arabic; Maghrebi; Moroccan; Eastern Morocco Arabic
- Writing system: Arabic alphabet

Language codes
- ISO 639-3: –
- Glottolog: oujd1238

Eastern Morocco Arabic or Oujda Darija is a dialectal continuum of Hilalian Arabic, mainly spoken in Oujda area and in a part of Oriental region of Morocco.

== See also ==
- Moroccan Arabic
