= Mohamed Choukri =

Moroccan author (1935–2003)

- محمد شكري
- Born: 15 July 1935; Beni Chiker, Nador, Morocco
- Died: 15 November 2003 (aged 68); Rabat, Morocco
- Resting place: Marshan cemetery
- Occupations: Novelist, autobiographer
- Writing career
- Notable work: For Bread Alone
- Literary movement: Moroccan literature

Mohamed Choukri (Arabic: محمد شكري, Tamazight: ⵎⵓⵃⴰⵎⵎⴻⴷ ⵛⵓⴽⵔⵉ) (15 July 1935 – 15 November 2003) was a Moroccan author and novelist who is best known for his internationally acclaimed autobiography For Bread Alone (al-Khubz al-Hafi), which was described by the American playwright Tennessee Williams as "a true document of human desperation, shattering in its impact".

Choukri was born in 1935 in Beni Chiker (Ait Chicher, hence his adopted family name: Choukri / Chikri), a small village in the Rif mountains in the Nador province, Morocco. He was raised in a very poor family. He ran away from his strict father and became a homeless child living in the poor neighbourhoods of Tangier, surrounded by misery, violence and drug abuse. At the age of 20, he decided to learn how to read and write and later became a schoolteacher. His family name Choukri is connected to the name Beni Chiker which is the Amazigh tribe cluster he belonged to before fleeing hunger to Tangier. It is most likely that he adopted this name later in Tangier because in the rural Rif family names were rarely registered.

In the 1960s, in the cosmopolitan Tangier, he met Paul Bowles, Jean Genet and Tennessee Williams. Choukri's first writing was published in Al Adab (monthly review of Beirut) in 1966, a story entitled "Al-Unf ala al-shati" ("Violence on the Beach"). International success came with the English translation of Al-khoubz Al-Hafi (For Bread Alone, Telegram Books) by Paul Bowles in 1973. The book was translated into French by Tahar Ben Jelloun in 1980 (Éditions Maspero), published in Arabic in 1982 and censored in Morocco from 1983 to 2000. The book was later translated into 30 languages.

His main works are his autobiographical trilogy, beginning with For Bread Alone, followed by Zaman Al-Akhtaâ aw Al-Shouttar (Time of Mistakes or Streetwise, Telegram Books) and finally Faces. He also wrote collections of short stories in the 1960s/1970s (Majnoun Al-Ward, The Flower Freak, 1980; Al-Khaima, The Tent, 1985). Likewise, he is known for his accounts of his encounters with the writers Paul Bowles, Jean Genet and Tennessee Williams (Jean Genet and Tennessee Williams in Tangier, 1992, Jean Genet in Tangier, 1993, Jean Genet, Suite and End, 1996, Paul Bowles: Le Reclus de Tanger, 1997). See also In Tangier, Telegram Books, 2008, for all three in one volume.

Choukri died of cancer on 15 November 2003 at the military hospital of Rabat. He was buried on 17 November at the Marshan cemetery in Tangier, with the audience of the minister of culture, numerous government officials, personalities and the spokesman of the king of Morocco. Before he died, Choukri created a foundation, Mohamed Choukri (president, Mohamed Achaâri), owning his copyrights, his manuscripts and personal writings. Before his death, he provided for his servant of almost 22 years.

== Early years ==
Mohamed Choukri was born to a poor family in Had, Bni Chiker in the Rif region of Morocco, during a famine. He was one of many children and had an abusive, violent father. His mother tongue was Riffian, a language of the Amazigh language family. Fleeing poverty, his family migrated to the city of Tétouan and then to Tangier. Through his adolescent years, Choukri worked many jobs to survive, including serving a French family in the Rif of French Algeria, and guiding sailors who arrived in Tangier, managing to learn Spanish that way. He found himself in the company of prostitutes, thieves and smugglers. The situation at home didn't improve however, his father was a cruel despot, and Choukri accused him of murdering his wife and his younger brother Kader. After a family dispute, he left them at 11 years old, living on the streets of Tangier, pilfering to survive, and occasionally resorting to smuggling and prostitution. At the age of 20, he'd met someone willing to teach him to read and write.

== Learning how to read and write ==
He met someone willing to help him learn to read and write in Standard Arabic, a strange language for him and to many who weren't formally educated, because what was spoken day to day was Moroccan vernacular Arabic or Darija, which is not readily intelligible with Standard Arabic. In 1956 (the year of Morocco's independence) he left for Larache, enrolling in a primary school at the age of 21. At some point he became a schoolteacher through the Ecole Normale. Returning to Tangier in the 1960s, he continued to frequent bars and brothels, and began to write his story in Arabic, forthrightly and showing no reserve when detailing sexual experiences, which was utterly at odds with the mores of Morocco and the Arab world at the time, being met with harsh censure from religious and conservative forces in Morocco and elsewhere.

Despite the criticism, Choukri's daring and exceedingly frank style won him literary fame. He had an association with the writer and composer Paul Bowles, an American expat who lived in Tangier, for decades. They worked on the translation of Choukri's semi-autobiographical work For Bread Alone in 1973, and Bowles arranged for the novel to be published in the United Kingdom through Peter Owen.

== Censorship of For Bread Alone ==
For Bread Alone became an international success when published in English, but the book also caused a furor in the Arab world. When the Arabic edition emerged, it was prohibited in Morocco, on the authority of the Interior Minister, Driss Basri, following the advice of the religious authorities. It was said to have offended by its references to teenage sexual experiences and drug abuse. This censorship ended in 2000, and For Bread Alone was finally published in Morocco. In 1999, For Bread Alone was removed from the syllabus of a modern Arabic literature course at the American University in Cairo taught by Dr. Samia Mehrez due to some sexually explicit passages, prompting some observers to criticize the "ban" and blame government censorship. The incident was preceded by the removal by order of Hosni Mubarak, president of Egypt, of Maxime Rodinson's book Muhammad. While some blamed "intimidation from Islamist militants, which the government does little to prevent," in fact, the Egyptian government engaged in book banning in that period on a wide scale. Dr. Mehrez was threatened with sexual harassment proceedings and expulsion, the book For Bread Alone was examined by parliament, and the academic and literary community largely supported her use of the novel through a letter-writing campaign.

== Later life ==
Choukri believed he had secured that which was most important to him: a posthumous home for his literary work.

His last will and testament, in which he left his entire estate to a foundation that was to be run jointly by five presidents: "After Choukri's death, this document disappeared without a trace," says Roberto de Hollanda, who was the author's literary agent for many years.

Securing his literary legacy was of the utmost importance to Choukri, but the promises that were made to him were not kept: "The decision was whether to give it to a European or an American university or whether to entrust it to a Moroccan institution," the literary agent explains.

Choukri chose the Moroccan option. For one thing, he was afraid that the government might stop funding his expensive cancer treatment if he gave away the rights to his work to a foreign entity. On the other hand, it would have been particularly shameful to have given them to one of the countries that had formerly colonized and oppressed Morocco.

== Films ==
For Bread Alone was adapted to film by Rachid Benhadj, in an Italian-French-Algerian production in 2004. It starred Said Taghmaoui. The film premiered at the first edition of the Festival of Casablanca in 2005.

Choukri also appears in Mathias Enard's novel Zone, wherein the narrator meets with him in Tangier, reminiscing about Jean Genet and other matters.

== Quotations ==
When I arrived, there were two Tangiers: the colonialist and international Tangier and the Arabic Tangier, made of misery and ignorance. At these times, to eat, I would comb through the garbage. Europeans' garbage, preferably, because they were richer.

I cannot write about the milk of birds, the gentle stranglehold of the angelic beauty, grasps of dew, the cascade of lions, the heavy breast of females. I cannot write with a crystal's paintbrush. For me, writing is a protest, not a parade.

I saw that writing could also be a way to expose, to protest against those who have stolen my childhood, my teenage years and a piece of my youthfulness. At that moment, my writing became committed.

In Moroccan society, there is a more conservative faction. Those people judge my works as depraved. In my books, there's nothing against the regime. I don't talk about politics or religion. But, what annoys the conservatives, is to notice I criticize my father. The father is sacred in Arabic-Muslim society.

== Works ==
- For Bread Alone, 1973
- The Tent, short stories, 1985
- Time of Errors, also called "Streetwise" 1992
- Jean Genet and Tennessee Williams in Tanger, 1992
- Jean Genet in Tanger, 1993
- Madman of the Roses, Short stories 1979
- Jean Genet, Suite and End, 1996
- Zoco Chico, 1997
- Faces, 2000
- The Internal Market, 1997
- Paul Bowles, le Reclus de Tanger, 1997

=== Compilations in English ===
- Tales of Tangier, trans. Jonas Elbousty (Yale University Press, 2023)
- "Faces," Trans. Jonas Elbousty (Georgetown University Press, 2024)

== See also ==
- Moroccan literature

== Bibliography ==
- Mohamed Choukri, 1935-2003, Oussama Zekri, (French)
- "Le pain nu de Mohamed Choukri: une lecture plurielle", par Salah NATIJ, in website Ma'duba / Invitation à l'adab (French)
- Le pain nu de Mohamed Choukri et l'aventure de la traduction, par Salah NATIJ, in website Ma'duba / Invitation à l'adab (French)
- Hassan Daoud, L'homme qui savait ce qu'écrire veut dire, (French)
- Le poète aux pieds nus, Hanan Kassab-Hassan, (French)
- L'enfant terrible de la littérature arabe et écrivain maudit, Hicham Raji, (French)
- Mohamed Choukri Biography by Kenneth Lisenbee (English)
- Obituary, Mohamed Choukri, Madman of the roses, November 2003, (English)
