= Mala'bat al-Kafif az-Zarhuni =

14th century epic poem

Malaʿbat al-Kafīf az-Zarhūnī (Arabic: ملعبة الكفيف الزرهوني) is a 14th-century epic poem in the zajal style composed by Al-Kafif az-Zarhuni in a medieval variety of Maghrebi colloquial Arabic. Some have described it as the oldest text in Moroccan Darija, or Moroccan vernacular Arabic. The poem narrates the 1347–1348 campaign of the Marinid Sultan Abu Hasan ʿAli bin ʿUthman against the Hafsid dynasty from the point of view of the Marinids. The text of the poem, which has been preserved, is an important record for the dialectology and historical linguistics of medieval vernacular Arabic in the Maghreb.

== Name ==
The name Malaʿbat (ملعبة 'playground' or 'place of play') refers to al-Kafif's playing around with the qafiyas, or rhyme schemes.

This kind of poetry flourished in the Marinid period, and Ibn Khaldun discusses the spread of zajal in the Muqaddimah:

إن أهل فاس وغيرهم استحسنوا هذا الفن، وولعوا به، ونظموا على طريقته، وتركوا الإعراب الذي ليس من شأنهم، وكثر سماعه بينهم، واستفحل فيه كثير منهم

Indeed the people of Fes and others improved this art and gave themselves to it, and composed in this style, and abandoned the ʾiʿrab that they didn't care for, and it was heard more among them, and many of them thrived in it."

And he added, speaking specifically about al-Kafif az-Zarhuni and the Malaʿbat:

"An outstanding poet in Zarhun, 1295 in the region of Meknes, close to the present time, was a man known as alKafif (the blind one). He produced original specimens of these types of poetry."

al-Zarhuni organized his Malaʿbat on the subject of the military campaign into Hafsid territory, led by Sultan Abu al-Hasan Ali ibn Othman of the Marinid dynasty. The goal of the campaign was to unite the Maghreb under one state. The campaign failed as the Marinids were defeated at Qairawan. The poem was a sort of consolation for the defeat, and it serves as a valuable historical document as it details the social and political situation at the time.
