= Market common =

Market Common may refer to:

- Market Common Clarendon in Arlington, Virginia
- The Market Common in Myrtle Beach, South Carolina

== See also ==
- Common Market (disambiguation)
