= Al-Kafif az-Zarhuni =

14th century Moroccan poet

Abdullah Al-Kafif az-Zarhuni
- عبد الله الكفيف الزرهوني
- Born: Zerhoun, Morocco
- Died: 1348
- Writing career
- Language: Moroccan Arabic
- Notable work: ملعبة الكفيف الزرهوني ("Mala'bat al-Kafif az-Zarhuni")

Abdullah al-Kafif az-Zarhuni (Arabic: عبد الله الكفيف الزرهوني; born in Zerhoun - died 1348) was a Moroccan zajal poet in the Marinid period. He is known for composing an epic zajal poem known as Mala'bat al-Kafif az-Zarhuni (Arabic: ملعبة الكفيف الزرهوني, al-Kafif az-Zarhuni's Playground), considered the first text in Moroccan vernacular Arabic, in the period of Abu al-Hasan Ali ibn Othman al-Marini.

== Biography ==
Sources on the life of al-Kafif az-Zarhuni are rare; the most important is Ibn Khaldun's Muqaddimah, which mentions Mala'bat al-Kafif az-Zarhuni and refers to its author only by his laqab. Ibn Khaldun mentions that al-Kafif az-Zarhuni was visually impaired, which explains his laqab al-Kafif (Arabic: الكفيف the blind). Muḥammad Bin Sharīfah, an expert on Mala'bat al-Kafif az-Zarhuni states that az-Zarhuni's name was Abdullah.

Ibn Khaldun states that al-Kafif came from the Sariwa tribe of the Beni Yazgha near Sefrou, and lived in the time of Sultan Abu al-Hasan al-Marini.

The second source is the Moroccan historian Muḥammad Bin Sharīfah's study of Mala'bat al-Kafif az-Zarhuni published in 1987, which posits that al-Kafif might have died around 1348 in the plague that struck Morocco.

== Mala'bat al-Kafif az-Zarhuni ==
al-Mala'ba takes the form of an epic poem in the zajal style. It took the name Mala'bat (playground) due to the al-Kafif's playing around with the qafiyas, or rhyme schemes. This kind of poetry flourished in the Marinid period, and Ibn Khaldun discusses the spread of zajal in the Muqaddimah:

"إن أهل فاس وغيرهم استحسنوا هذا الفن، وولعوا به، ونظموا على طريقته، وتركوا الإعراب الذي ليس من شأنهم، وكثر سماعه بينهم، واستفحل فيه كثير منهم

Indeed the people of Fes and others improved this art and gave themselves to it, and composed in this style, and abandoned the ʾiʿrab that they didn't care for, and it was heard more among them, and many of them thrived in it."

And he added, speaking specifically about al-Kafif az-Zarhuni and al-Mala'ba:

"An outstanding poet in Zarhun, 1295 in the region of Meknes, close to the present time, was a man known as alKafif (the blind one). He produced original specimens of these types of poetry."

al-Zarhuni organized his Malaaba on the subject of the military campaign into Hafsid territory, led by Sultan Abu al-Hasan Ali ibn Othman of the Marinid dynasty. The goal of the campaign was to unite the Maghreb under one state. The campaign failed as the Marinids were defeated at Qairawan. The poem was a sort of consolation for the defeat, and it serves as a valuable historical document as it details the social and political situation at the time.
