= Hicham Nostik =

Moroccan writer, podcaster and YouTuber (born 1976)

- هشام نوستيك
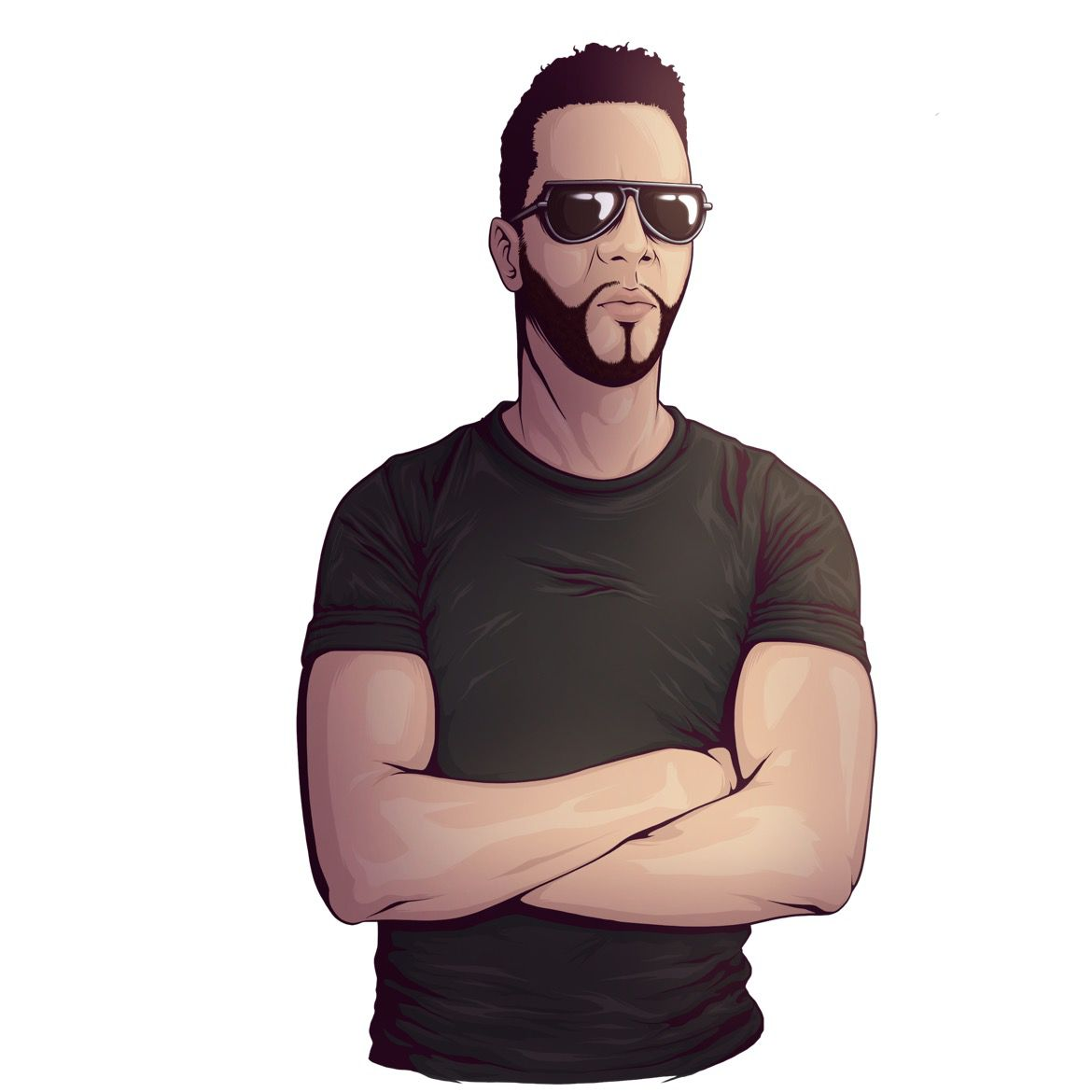
- Born: 1976 (age 49–50); Taza, Morocco
- Education: Linguistics
- Website: www.hichamnostik.com

Hicham Nostik (Arabic: هشام نوستيك, also known as Kafer Maghribi كافر مغربي) born in 1976 in Taza, Morocco, is a Moroccan writer, podcaster and YouTuber, living in Canada, most known for his outspoken stance against Islam and religion in general, expressed through his books, podcasts and comedy videos, in Moroccan Arabic and Standard Arabic.

== Identity ==
The real name of Hicham Nostik is unknown. He was first known by his YouTube username Kafer Maghribi (Arabic for Moroccan Infidel). He stated that he purposefully used the term kafer (infidel), a pejorative term in Islamic countries, so that people would get used to it, and to the fact that infidels do live among them. The name Nostik was derived from agnostic.

In an interview with writer and intellectual Hamed Abdel-Samad on his program Box of Islam, he used makeup to keep his identity anonymous.

== Life ==
=== Childhood ===
Hicham Nostik was born in Taza, grew up an orphan after losing both his parents at a young age, and was raised by his sister in Kenitra.

He joined the Islamist Al Adl Wa Al Ihssane organization at a young age, then the Movement of Unicity and Reform, another Islamist organization in Morocco.

=== Moving to Germany ===
In the mid-1990s, Nostik moved to Germany to study German literature. He stayed in a mosque in Heidelberg since he could not afford to pay rent, and was radicalized due to his constant interaction with Muslim extremists and Mujahideen. At the instigation of his friends at the time, he traveled twice to join the Balkan war in Bosnia and Herzegovina as a Mujahid, but did not participate in the combat. He later left the mosque, and had to move around until he found an opportunity in Frankfurt, and enrolled in a Christian University. This allowed him to study Christianity and its history, and compare this knowledge with the Islamic understanding of Christianity, which according to him contradicted the historical evidence, regarding the origin and evolution of Christianity. This led him to question other aspects of Islam, such as the morality of Sharia laws, e.g. slavery, punishment for apostasy, etc.

He later finished a master's degree in linguistics.

After his application for German citizenship was rejected three times, he moved to Canada.

=== Family ===
Nostik is married and has two children.

== Views ==
Hicham Nostik is an agnostic atheist. He does not believe in the Abrahamic god who intervenes in human affairs, but does not deny the possibility of some sort of god to exist under some other definition. He does not for example reject, deist or pantheist conceptions of deities.

In politics, Nostik supports Constitutional monarchy as the best political system for Morocco in his opinion. He was also in favor of the Israel–Morocco normalization agreement.

He believes that many Moroccans have been alienated from their Amazigh origins and culture, and taken over by Arabism and Islamism. He considers Islam and the Arab nationalist ideology as the causes of this "acculturation" or loss of identity in Morocco. Nostik is himself of Rifian Amazigh descent, but does not speak Tarifit.

He also stated that he follows a philosophy he calls pragmatic nihilism, which is the topic of his most recent book.

== Work ==
=== Books ===
All works of Hicham Nostik were originally written in Moroccan Darija, using Arabic characters. His first book Notes of a Moroccan Infidel was also translated to French.

- Notes of a Moroccan Infidel (original title: مذكرات كافر مغربي, also known as Memories of a Moroccan Infidel): published by Dar Al Watan publishing house, is an autobiography of the author, where he recounts his childhood and life in Germany until he left Islam. It was a best-selling book in the 2019 and 2020 editions of the Casablanca Book Fair. Translated to French by Hatim Jawhari in 2020, under the title Mémoires d'un Apostat.
- Discussion with my Inner-Muslim (original title: حوار مع المسلم اللي ساكن فيا, also known as Dialogue with the Muslim who lives inside me): published by Dar Al-Tawhidi publishing house, is a semi-autobiographical time-travel story where the author encounters himself in the past, before he left Islam, and discusses various topics with himself. In the Salon international du livre de Casablanca (Casablanca International Book Fair) in 2020, all 500 copies of the book at the fair were sold.
- Pragmatic Nihilism; the Key to Happiness (original title: العدمية البراغماتية ؛ مفتاح السعادة): published in January 2022.

Hicham Nostik previously announced that he will be working on a book about Christianity.

=== YouTube channels ===
Hicham Nostik had several YouTube channels, first of which was Kafer Maghribi, which was closed due to massive reporting. He then created the channel Kafer Maghribi LIVE, renamed later as Hicham Nostik where he makes regular podcasts, comedy videos and discussions, and the channel Hiwarat Hicham (حوارات هشام, or Hicham's discussions), where he invites known and obscure personalities to discuss various topics, mostly related to religion and politics.

Some of the most prominent personalities he interviewed include:

- Former Tunisian president Moncef Marzouki
- Former Moroccan Minister of Tourism Lahcen Haddad
- Israeli Lieutenant Colonel Avichay Adraee
- Salafist Mohamed Fizazi
- Moroccan Christian TV host and writer Brother Rachid
- German-Egyptian intellectual Hamed Abdel-Samad
- Moroccan intellectual Ahmed Assid
- Moroccan intellectual Said Nachid
- Egyptian intellectual Sayyid Al-Qemany
- Liberal Muslim intellectual and former Islamist Abdelwahab Rafiki, also known as Abou Hafs
- Syrian human rights activist Rana Ahmad
- Iraqi intellectual Ahmed Al-Gubbanchi
- Jordanian molecular biologist Rana Dajani
- Moroccan intellectual Rachid Aylal

==== Comedy series ====
One of the first comedy series written and produced by Nostik on his channel was Qabasat min hayat ar-rasul (قبسات من حياة الرسول, snippets from the life of the messenger), in Moroccan Darija, which consists of a series of videos usually 15 to 40 minutes long, each about a specific episode from the life of Muhammad, using voice actors to play different roles.

Another series was Qabasat min hayat al anbiyaa (قبسات من حياة الأنبياء, snippets from the life of the prophets), with the same idea, but applied to the lives of Islamic prophets, such as Jesus, Moses, Solomon and Noah.

On his channel Taboo Toon, he also wrote and produced the series Maedat al anbiyaa (مائدة الأنبياء, the table of the prophets) with original animation, which was aired on YouTube during Ramadan 2019.

He additionally produced music videos with atheistic themes, some of them subtitled or translated to other languages such as Arabic and English.

Due to several participants in his works receiving death threats, Nostik decided to delete most comedy works regarding Islam from his main channel. They are however still available on YouTube on fan channels.

==== Other ====
On his main YouTube channel Hicham Nostik, he has regular or semi-regular podcasts including Rukn al kafir (ركن الكافر, the infidel's corner), Hicham yjawbek (هشام يجاوبك, Hicham answers you), and hasad al usbuu (حصاد الأسبوع, Harvest of the week). He's also publishing his first book as an audiobook read by himself, in each video chapter by chapter, and has hitherto unfinished podcasts, such as a series about the First World War, and a summary and translation of Sapiens: A Brief History of Humankind in Moroccan Darija. Not to mention short series or standalone videos about various topics.

Nostik received an offer to become a host at the Evangelical Christian channel Al Hayat TV, but he refused the role to keep his anonymity, among other reasons.

== Reception ==
Hicham Nostik has been described as "the prophet of atheism" and as "one of the most influential Moroccan atheists" on Moroccan social media.

He was the main subject of a research paper on atheism in Morocco, at Moulay Ismail University in Meknes, Morocco, stating that "Nostik speaks and writes in the Moroccan dialect to demystify Islam’s sacred Arabic texts through ‘subcultural modes of knowledge production’" (Kettioui 2020).

He was also subject of criticism, notably by Moroccan intellectual Driss Guenbouri who stated that "their [Nostik's and Hamed Abdel-Samad's] stance against Islam is not intellectual or rational, but rather pathological psychological".
