= Common market (disambiguation) =

A common market is a free trade area with relatively free movement of capital and services.

The European Economic Community is sometimes referred to as the "Common Market", a regional organisation from 1958 to 1993.

Common market or Common Market may also refer to:

- European Single Market, referred to as the "European Common Market" prior to 1993
- Common Market (hip hop group)
  - Common Market (album)
- Common Market (cocktail)

== See also ==
- European Economic Area
- European Union, an economic-political union
- Internal market (disambiguation)
- Market common (disambiguation)
