= The Internal Market (novel) =

1997 biographical novel by Muhammad Shukri

- Author: Muhammad Shukri
- Language: Arabic
- Genre: Biographical Novel
- Publisher: Al-Jamal Publishing
- Publication date: 1997

The Internal Market is 1997 biographical novel by the Moroccan writer Muhammad Shukri, published by Al-Jamal Publishing.

== Overview of The Novel ==
The Internal Market is a biographical novel, in the same vein as Shukri's other novels, especially the ones published after his novel For Bread Alone, published in 1983. In his novel, Shukri focuses on character-development and the dynamic between them instead of focusing on the plot. The novel portrays the alienation experienced by the protagonist, who embodies Shukri himself, offering thorough descriptions of his loneliness and alienation in the city. Shukri picked the internal market as the setting of the novel as it is the place of impoverished and marginalized Moroccans during that period.

== Literary Criticism ==
Critics agree that the novel depicts the state of marginalization experienced by Moroccans during that time period. The late Spanish poet, Juan Goytsolo, said about Muhammad Shukri that he "looked at the life of his country from the bottom, and saw what those in power do not see or are unable to see." As for Arab writers, they that he was "a story" and that he "mocked modern Arab culture." As for Shukri, he said that his aim in the novel is to portray the ugliness that exists in his life and the lives of others, and in society in general.

== Other Novels by Shukri ==
- For Bread Alone
- Streetwise
- In Tangier
- Temptation of The White Blackbird
