= Hilalian dialects =

Continuum of Arabic dialects native to the Maghreb

- اللهجات الهلالية
- Region: Maghreb
- Ethnicity: Arabs
- Language family: Afro-Asiatic: Semitic; West Semitic; Central Semitic; Arabic; Maghrebi Arabic; Hilalian dialects
- Dialects: Libyan; Tamanrasset; Hassaniya; Western Morocco Arabic; Western Egyptian Bedawi Arabic
- Writing system: Arabic alphabet

Language codes
- ISO 639-3: –

The Hilalian dialects (Arabic: اللهجات الهلالية) are a continuum of Arabic dialects of the Maghreb, which were introduced during the Hilalian invasions between the 11th and 12th centuries, as well as the migration of Arab Hilalian tribes to the Western Maghreb. These dialects played a great role in the emergence of the Egyptian and Maghrebi dialects. The Bani Hilal tribes settled in the region of Casablanca-Settat in Morocco, parts of Libya, central Algeria, and Tunisia.

== Etymology ==
The term Hilalian dialects refer to Banu Hilal, a confederation of Arab nomadic tribes who invaded North Africa in the eleventh century. The story is documented in an epic poem called Sirat Bani Hilal. One famous man who fought against the Berber tribes of Zenata and Sanhaja and guaranteed the independence of the Hawazin tribes was Abu Zayd al-Hilali.

Along with the pre-existing sedentary pre-Hilalian Arabic dialects, they constitute the larger Maghrebi Arabic family. The Hilalian dialects hold a close resemblance to the Gulf Arabic dialect, since they both developed from tribal Arabian dialects.

== Varieties and distribution ==
Hilalian dialects are found across North Africa, from the western plains of Morocco and the Mauritanian desert to western Egypt, including Libya, the Algerian Hautes-Plaines and coast, and Tunisia.

Nevertheless, there are several enclaves of Pre-Hilalian Arabic dialects in this area, including old urban dialect-speaking cities (such as Fez, Rabat, Tétouan, Salé, Casablanca, Tlemcen, Constantine, Tunis) and four major sedentary rural dialects speaking areas as well as several Berber speaking areas.

Hilalian Arabic has six major varieties:

- Sulaym dialects: in Libya and southern Tunisia;
- Eastern Hilal dialects: in central Tunisia and eastern Algeria;
- Central Hilal dialects: in central and southern Algeria;
- Western Hilal dialects: in the western plains of Morocco (Chaouia, Doukkala, Abda, Gharb, etc).
- Maqil dialects: in western Algeria and Morocco.

Hassaniya Arabic, spoken in Mauritania, southern Morocco and parts of northern Mali, is also classified as Maqil.

Recent urbanization and Amazigh migrations have significantly reduced the number of speakers of the Hilalian dialects, as generations after French colonization began to abandon these dialects in favor of either the standard dialect of their country or a pre-Hilalian dialect spoken in the cities to which they migrated.

== See also ==
- Varieties of Arabic
- Pre-Hilalian Arabic dialects
- Maghrebi Arabic
