= Ahmed Al-Gubbanchi =

Iraqi intellectual (born 1958)

- Born: January 2, 1958 (age 68); Najaf, Iraq
- Occupations: Writer, Scholar

Ahmed Hasan Ali Al-Gubbanchi (Arabic: أحمد حسن علي القبانجي) is an Iraqi intellectual, born in Najaf in 1958, who focuses on developing a "Civil Islam" which is consistent with human rights, justice and modern circumstances, addressing the problems of traditional Islamic thought. He has also translated many books of Abdolkarim Soroush into Arabic.

Al-Gubbanchi moved to Iran in the 1980s and returned to Iraq in 2008 to establish a Liberal Islamism movement. In 2012, his own brother, Sadriddin Al-Gubbanchi, spoke against him which caused him to leave his home city of Najaf to Baghdad. In February 2013 he was arrested during a visit to Iran. After protests from his supporters in front of the Iranian embassy in Baghdad, he was released from detention in March 2013.

== Thoughts ==
Ahmed Al-Gubbanchi sees worshiping as a means not an end itself, and that if it will not improve the morality of the human being, it is useless, noting in an interview with Al-Baghdadia Channel that most of the terrorists of today are religious and good worshipers, he sees that the traditional Islamic thought unable to find a solution for many problematic issues, for instance, it is unable to address clearly the relation between the situation and time of the early Islamic society of Muhammad and the scripture, therefore still considering many regressive issues as part of Islamic Sharia, like, Apostasy, Stoning, Inequality for women, discrimination against non-Muslims in the Islamic society. The way to get rid of these practices is, according to him, in addition to criticism of Hadith as he has done in his book (Rectification of the Hadith of Shia), also to rethink the whole concept of inspiration, he comes up with the belief that the words of Quran is not the literal word of God, rather the meanings is from God, while the knowledge and the phrasing of Quran is from Muhammad intended to suit with the conditions of his time, which is why, he allowed seven ways of reading the Quran, he also believes that Muslims need not to consider the verses of Quran literally today when they conflict with the "Practical reason", just as Mu'tazila did formerly with the verses which conflict with the "Theoretical reason".

== Books ==
He has written many books (in Arabic) and translated many others into Arabic including:

Authored:

- Civil Islam
- Islam the religion
- Prophecy and the problem of divine inspiration
- Rectification of the Hadith of Shia
- The divine justice and freedom of the human
- The woman, the concepts and rights
- Theories in Psychology

Translated for Abdolkarim Soroush

- The Secular Religion
- The reason and freedom
- Politics and Religiousness
