= Algerian Saharan Arabic =

Arabic variety spoken predominantly in the Algerian Sahara

- Saharan Arabic; Tamanrasset Arabic; Tamanghasset Arabic
- Native to: Algeria
- Region: Atlas Mountains, southern Sahara
- Speakers: 310,000 (2022)
- Language family: Afro-Asiatic: Semitic; West Semitic; Central Semitic; Arabic; Maghrebi; Algerian Saharan Arabic

Language codes
- ISO 639-3: aao
- Glottolog: alge1240
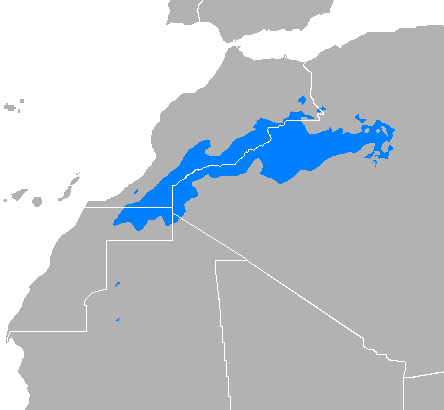

Algerian Saharan Arabic (also known as Saharan Arabic, Tamanrasset Arabic, Tamanghasset Arabic) is a variety of Arabic indigenous to and spoken predominantly in the Algerian Sahara. Its ISO 639-3 language code is "aao," and it belongs to Maghrebi Arabic. It is spoken by an estimated 100,000 people in Algeria, most of them along the Moroccan border with the Atlas Mountains. It is also spoken by about 10,000 people in neighboring regions of Niger, and by minorities in bordering regions of Mauritania, Mali, and Libya. It was spoken also by people to the north of the former colony of Western Sahara abandoned by Spain before the short conflict with Mauritania and the unresolved conflict with Morocco that annexed and controlled most of its territory. Most Western Saharan population to flee, and many of them live now in refugee camps in Algeria. It is still spoken in the small unoccupied regions of Western Sahara still controlled by the Sahrawi Arab Democratic Republic (but also claimed by Morocco).

== See also ==
- Varieties of Arabic
- Maghrebi Arabic
