= For Bread Alone =

Book by Mohamed Choukri

- The cover of the novel
- Author: Mohammed Choukri
- Original title: الخُبْزُ الحَافِي
- Translator: Paul Bowles
- Language: Arabic
- Genre: Autobiography
- Published: 1982
- Publication place: Morocco

For Bread Alone (Arabic: الخبز الحافي, al-Khubz al-Hafi) is a controversial autobiographical work by Mohammed Choukri. It was written in Arabic in 1972 and translated into English by Paul Bowles in 1973. In 1980, it was published in French as Le Pain Nu in a translation by Tahar Ben Jelloun. The novel has been translated into 39 foreign languages and adapted into a French graphic novel by Abdelaziz Mouride.

== Content ==
=== Family ===
The novel follows Choukri, who was illiterate until he was twenty. It discusses the pressure of colonialism and the spread of poverty, hunger, ignorance, and epidemics, where eating from trash bins and sorcery rituals such as drinking blood with the intention of healing were the norm in his youth. He coexists with morally wrong individuals and groups, and grew up in a family, where his father was unjust and cruel, taking snuff and cursing God. The violence Choukri grows up around leads to his spiritual, moral, and ethical destruction and makes him reject the traditional family system in which the father is positioned at the top. His intense hatred for his father prompted him to replace his patriarchal society with a feminine one, and a tendency for violence and revenge was born, "in my imagination, I don't remember how many times I killed him." When his father was beaten in front of him, this scene was a consolation for him.

=== Tangier ===
Choukri flees the countryside to Tangier, encountering foreigners, prostitution, drugs, and the underworld. The narrator chases women throughout his life, engages with bestiality, passing through Asia, Fatima, Sulafa, and the prostitutes. Choukri came to the city by force and not by choice while his father was on the run from Franco's army, and he is arrested and imprisoned for two years, which he spends between Tangier and Asilah. In the port of Tangier, Shukri sells cigarettes and drugs to foreigners and led American soldiers to European brothels.

== Publication history ==
For Bread Alone is the first part of Choukri's autobiography that consists of three works. In addition to this novel, there are Time of Mistakes and Faces. The writer said that the idea of an autobiography came from his American writer friend Paul Bowles, and he sold it orally before he started writing it. Tahar Ben Jelloun translated For Bread Alone into French and it was published by Maspero Publishing House. The book stayed hidden for twenty years before it was published by Choukri in Arabic in Morocco. The work sparked an uproar in modern Arab literature and was banned in most Arab countries, as its critics considered it bold in a way that does not conform to the traditions of Arab societies. The book is still banned or almost banned in most Arab countries.

=== Title ===
Ben Jelloun chose to translate Choukri's title with an intermediate title for the Francophone reader: Le Pain Nu (transl. The naked bread).

== Cinema ==
In 2004, Algerian director Rachid Ben has adapted the autobiography into a film of the same name.
