= Maghrebi Arabic =

Family of Arabic dialects spoken in the Maghreb

- Darija, Darja, Derja; Western Arabic; North African Arabic
- اللهجات المغاربية
- Region: Maghreb
- Ethnicity: Maghrebi Arabs, also used as a second language by other ethnic groups in the Maghreb
- Native speakers: 88 million (2020–2022)
- Language family: Afro-Asiatic: Semitic; West Semitic; Central Semitic; Arabic; Maghrebi Arabic
- Dialects: Algerian Arabic; Moroccan Arabic; Libyan Arabic; Tunisian Arabic; Hassaniya Arabic; Saharan Arabic; Siculo-Arabic (survives as Maltese); Andalusi Arabic †; Dialectal continuums: Hilalian dialects; Pre-Hilalian dialects
- Writing system: Arabic alphabet (Maghrebi script), Latin alphabet

Language codes
- ISO 639-3: Variously: arq – Algerian Arabic xaa – Andalusi Arabic mey – Hassaniya Arabic ayl – Libyan Arabic mlt – Maltese ary – Moroccan Arabic aao – Saharan Arabic sqr – Siculo-Arabic aeb – Tunisian Arabic
- Glottolog: nort3191

Maghrebi Arabic, (Note: Arabic: اللَّهْجَة الْمَغارِبِيَّة, romanized: al-lahja l-maghāribiyya, lit. 'Western Arabic' as opposed to Eastern or Mashriqi Arabic) often known as ad-Dārija (Note: Darja, Derdja, Derja, Derija or Darija, depending on the region's dialect.) (Note: Arabic: الدارجة, meaning 'common/everyday [dialect]') to differentiate it from Literary Arabic, is a vernacular Arabic dialect continuum spoken in the Maghreb. It includes the Moroccan, Algerian, Tunisian, Libyan, Hassaniya and Saharan Arabic dialects.

The Maghrebi Arabic dialects have a predominantly Semitic and Arabic vocabulary, although it contains a significant number of Berber loanwords, which represent 10–15% of the vocabulary of Moroccan Arabic, 8–9% of Algerian and 2–3% of Tunisian Arabic and Libyan Arabic. Maghrebi Arabic was formerly spoken in Sicily and Al-Andalus until the 13th and 17th centuries, respectively, in the extinct forms of Siculo-Arabic and Andalusi Arabic. The Maltese language is believed to have its source in a language spoken in Muslim Sicily that ultimately originates from Tunisia, as it contains some typical Maghrebi Arabic areal characteristics.

== Proto-Maghrebi Arabic ==
=== Phonology ===
The common ancestor of Maghrebi Arabic had the same phonology as Modern Standard Arabic, with a few key differences.

Proto-Maghrebi Arabic vowels
| | Short | | Long | |
| | Front | Back | Front | Back |
|---|---|---|---|---|
| Close | i | u | iː | uː |
| Mid | i | u | (eː)* | (oː)* |
| Open | a | | aː | |

Notes: * The Arabic diphthongs /aj/ and /aw/ have mostly collapsed into /iː/ and /uː/ in most Maghrebi dialects west of Libya, unlike the phonemes /eː/ and /oː/ in Mashriqi dialects. e.g. لون ('color') /lawn/ and عين ('eye') /ʕajn/ in Standard Arabic are pronounced /luːn/ and /ʕiːn/ in Maghrebi dialects (Algerian, Moroccan, and Tunisian), and pronounced /loːn/ and /ʕeːn/ in Libyan and Mashriqi dialects.

Proto-Maghrebi Arabic consonants
| | | Labial | Dental | Denti-alveolar | | Palatal | Velar | Uvular | Pharyngeal | Glottal |
| | | Labial | Dental | plain | emphatic | Palatal | Velar | Uvular | Pharyngeal | Glottal |
|---|---|---|---|---|---|---|---|---|---|---|
| Nasal | | m ⟨م⟩ | | n ⟨ن⟩ | | | | | | |
| Stop | voiceless | | | t ⟨ت⟩ | tˤ ⟨ط⟩ | | k ⟨ك⟩ | q ⟨ق⟩ | | ʔ ⟨ء⟩ |
| Stop | voiced | b ⟨ب⟩ | | d ⟨د⟩ | | d͡ʒ ⟨ج⟩ | | | | |
| Fricative | voiceless | f ⟨ف⟩ | θ ⟨ث⟩ | s ⟨س⟩ | sˤ ⟨ص⟩ | ʃ ⟨ش⟩ | x ~ χ ⟨خ⟩ | | ħ ⟨ح⟩ | h ⟨ه⟩ |
| Fricative | voiced | | ð ⟨ذ⟩ | z ⟨ز⟩ | ðˤ ⟨ظ⟩, ⟨ض⟩* | | ɣ ~ ʁ ⟨غ⟩ | | ʕ ⟨ع⟩ | |
| Trill | | | | r ⟨ر⟩ | | | | | | |
| Approximant | | | | l ⟨ل⟩ | | j ⟨ي⟩ | w ⟨و⟩ | | | |

* Classical Arabic /dˤ/ and /ðˤ/ merged with each other in all varieties of Arabic.

=== Vocabulary ===
Maghrebi regionalisms are mostly reduced forms of Arabic phrases.

*ذَرْوَكْت (*ḏarwakt) < ذَا اَلوَقْت (ḏā al-waqt)

*أشكون (*ʔaškōn) < أَيُّ شَيْء كَوْن (*ʔēš *kōn < ʔayy šayʔ kawn).

=== Grammar ===
Proto-Maghrebi had already lost all nunation and most of the i'rāb, with the exception of the adverbial accusative, which was unproductive.

An n- prefix is added to the first person singular in some verb forms, which distinguishes maghrebi Arabic from all other varieties of Arabic.

== Name ==
Darija, Derija or Delja (Arabic: الدارجة) means "everyday/colloquial dialect"; it is also rendered as ed-dārija, derija or darja. It refers to any of the varieties of colloquial Maghrebi Arabic. Although it is also common in Algeria and Tunisia to refer to the Maghrebi Arabic varieties directly as languages, similarly it is also common in Egypt and Lebanon to refer to the Mashriqi Arabic varieties directly as languages. For instance, Algerian Arabic would be referred as Dzayri (Algerian) and Tunisian Arabic as Tounsi (Tunisian), and Egyptian Arabic would be referred as Masri (Egyptian) and Lebanese Arabic as Libnani (Lebanese).

In contrast, the colloquial dialects of more eastern Arab countries, such as Egypt, Jordan and Sudan, are usually known as al-‘āmmīya (العامية), though Egyptians may also refer to their dialects as el-logha d-darga.

== History and origin ==
Maghrebi Arabic can be divided into two lineages in North Africa. One originates from the urban Arabs and dates back to the Arab Muslim conquest of the Maghreb in the 7th and 8th centuries, referred to as Pre-Hilalian Arabic. The other stems from the Bedouin Arabic varieties brought in by the Bedouin Arab tribes of Banu Hilal, Banu Sulaym and Ma'qil in the 11th and 12th centuries, termed as Hilalian Arabic. The Pre-Hilalian varieties were largely bedouinized by the Hilalian migrations in the 11th century, producing hybrid varieties that combined both pre-Hilalian and Hilalian features. This led to the choice of Banu Hilal's Arabic as the lingua franca of the Maghreb. This variety, with influences from Berber languages and Punic, gave rise to the modern Arabic varieties in the Maghreb spoken by the vast majority of Maghrebis.

The Arabic language was spread across North Africa throughout the Rashidun and Umayyad conquests of the 7th and 8th centuries, during which about 150,000 Arabs settled in the Maghreb. As Arab-led forces established settlements in a triangle encompassing Roman towns and cities such as Tangier, Salé and Walili, Moroccan Arabic began to take form. Arabization was widespread in cities where both Arabs and Berbers lived, as well as Arab centers and surrounding rural areas. Nevertheless, the Arabization process in the countryside remained gradual until the Hilalian invasions of the 11th century.

Maghrebi Arabic originates from the Bedouin Arabic varieties that were introduced to the Maghreb in the 11th century by Banu Hilal and Banu Sulaym, who effectively accelerated the Arabization of a great part of the Berbers. Sources estimate that around 1 million Arabs migrated to the Maghreb in the 11th century. Their impact was profound and reshaped the demographic situation and living conditions across the Maghreb. They played a major role in spreading Bedouin Arabic to rural areas such as the countryside and steppes, and as far as the southern areas near the Sahara.

== Characteristics ==
The varieties of Maghrebi Arabic form a dialect continuum. The degree of mutual intelligibility is high between geographically adjacent dialects (such as local dialects spoken in Eastern Morocco and Western Algeria or Eastern Algeria and North Tunisia or South Tunisia and Western Libya), but lower between dialects that are further apart, e.g. between Moroccan and Tunisian Darija. Conversely, Moroccan Darija and particularly Algerian Derja cannot be easily understood by Eastern Arabic speakers (from Egypt, Sudan, Levant, Iraq, and Arabian peninsula) in general.

Maghrebi Arabic continues to evolve by integrating new French or English words, notably in technical fields, or by replacing old French and Italian/Spanish ones with Modern Standard Arabic words within some circles; more educated and upper-class people who code-switch between Maghrebi Arabic and Modern Standard Arabic have more French and Italian/Spanish loanwords, especially the latter came from the time of al-Andalus. Maghrebi dialects all use n- as the first-person singular prefix on verbs, distinguishing them from Levantine dialects and Modern Standard Arabic.

=== Relationship with Modern Standard Arabic and Berber languages ===
Modern Standard Arabic (Arabic: الفصحى, romanized: al-fuṣḥá) is the primary language used in the government, legislation and judiciary of countries in the Maghreb. Maghrebi Arabic is mainly a spoken and vernacular dialect, although it occasionally appears in entertainment and advertising in urban areas of Algeria, Morocco and Tunisia. In Algeria, where Maghrebi Arabic was taught as a separate subject under French colonization, some textbooks in the dialect exist but they are no longer officially endorsed by the Algerian authorities. Maghrebi Arabic has a mostly Semitic Arabic vocabulary. Studies looking at the Levenshtein distance between Maghrebi Arabic dialects and standard Arabic found that for Moroccan Arabic the percentage of synsets with word pairs that were at least 60% similar was 42.0% for Moroccan Arabic and for Algerian Arabic, 20% of words have a Levenshtein distance of 0 (i.e. original from Arabic) and 34% have a distance of 1 (i.e. one letter difference). Maghrebi Arabic also contains a large amount of Berber loanwords, which represent 2–3% of the vocabulary of Libyan Arabic, 8–9% of Algerian and Tunisian Arabic, and 10–15% of Moroccan Arabic. Berber borrowings into Arabic is significantly lower than Arabic borrowings into Berber languages. This is due the status of Berber languages among Arabic speakers.

=== Latin substratum ===
Additionally, Maghrebi Arabic has a Latin substratum, which may have been derived from the African Romance that was used as an urban lingua franca during the Byzantine Empire period. in morphology, this substratum is considered the origin of the plural noun morphemes -əsh/-osh that are common in northern Moroccan dialects, and probably the loss of gender in the second person singular of personal pronouns verbs, for example in Andalusian Arabic. The lexicon contains many loanwords from Latin, e.g. Moroccan/Algerian/Tunisian شَاقُور, shāqūr, 'hatchet' from secūris (this could also be borrowed from Spanish segur); ببوش, 'snail' from babōsus and فلوس, 'chick' from pullus through Berber afullus.

=== Relationship with other languages ===
In Maghrebi Arabic dialects, there are also loanwords from Turkish, French, Spanish, Sub-Saharan languages and Italian for Tunisian and Libyan Arabic. They conjugate them according to the rules of their dialects with some exceptions (like passive voice for example). As it is not always written, there is no standard and it is free to change quickly and to pick up new vocabulary from neighboring languages. This is comparable to the evolution of Middle English after the Norman Conquest. The dialect may also possess a substratum of Punic.

== See also ==
- Maghrebi Arabs
- Varieties of Arabic
- Moroccan Arabic
- Languages of Africa

== Sources ==
- Aguadé, Jordi (2018). "The Maghrebi dialects of Arabic". In Holes, Clive (ed.). Arabic Historical Dialectology Linguistic and Sociolinguistic Approaches. Oxford University Press. pp. 29–63. ISBN 9780198701378.
