= Varieties of Arabic =

Family of dialects/variants of the Arabic language

Colloquial Arabic
- اللهجات العربية
- Native to: Arab world and surrounding regions
- Ethnicity: Arabs, other ethnic groups of the Arab world
- Native speakers: 411 million (2020–2024)
- Language family: Afro-Asiatic: Semitic; West Semitic; Central Semitic; Arabic; Colloquial Arabic
- Early forms: Proto-Arabic: Old Arabic; Pre-classical Arabic
- Standard forms: Modern Standard Arabic
- Dialects: Central Asian; Chadian; Egyptian; Levantine; Maghrebi; Mesopotamian; Peninsular; Saʽidi; Shirvani †; Sudanese
- Writing system: Arabic alphabet, Arabizi

Language codes
- ISO 639-3: ara
- Geographical distribution of the varieties of Arabic

Varieties of Arabic (or dialects or vernaculars) are the linguistic systems that Arabic speakers speak natively. Arabic is a Semitic language within the Afroasiatic family that originated in the Arabian Peninsula. There are considerable variations from region to region, with degrees of mutual intelligibility that are often related to geographical distance and some that are mutually unintelligible. Many aspects of the variability attested to in these modern variants can be found in the ancient Arabic dialects in the peninsula. Likewise, many of the features that characterize (or distinguish) the various modern variants can be attributed to the original settler dialects as well as local native languages and dialects. Some organizations, such as SIL International, consider these approximately 30 different varieties to be separate languages, while others, such as the Library of Congress, consider them all to be dialects of Arabic.

In terms of sociolinguistics, a major distinction exists between the formal standardized language, found mostly in writing or in prepared speech, and the widely diverging vernaculars, used for everyday speaking situations. The latter vary from country to country, from speaker to speaker (according to personal preferences, education and culture), and depending on the topic and situation. In other words, Arabic in its natural environment usually occurs in a situation of diglossia, which means that its native speakers often learn and use two linguistic forms substantially different from each other, the Modern Standard Arabic (MSA) as the official language and a local colloquial variety (called العامية, al-ʿāmmiyya in many Arab countries, (Note: Also spelled Ammiya, Amiyya, Ammiyya, 'Ammiyya, 'Ammiya, Amiyah, Ammiyah, Amiyyah, Ammiyyah) meaning "slang" or "colloquial"; Or called الدارجة, ad-dārija, meaning "common or everyday language" in the Maghreb), in different aspects of their lives. This situation maybe compared to the way Latin evolved into many Romance languages, or Sanskrit into many Prakrits and related languages.

The regionally prevalent variety is learned as the speaker's first language whilst the formal language is subsequently learned in school. While vernacular varieties differ substantially, fuṣḥā (فصحى), the formal register, is standardized and universally understood by those literate in Arabic. Linguists often make a distinction between Classical Arabic and Modern Standard Arabic, while speakers of Arabic colloquially do not differentiate CA and MSA as different varieties.

The largest differences between the classical/standard and the colloquial Arabic are the loss of grammatical case; a different and strict word order; the loss of the previous system of grammatical mood, along with the evolution of a new system; the loss of the inflected passive voice, except in a few relic varieties; restriction in the use of the dual number and (for most varieties) the loss of the distinctive conjugation and agreement for feminine plurals. Many Arabic dialects, Maghrebi Arabic in particular, also have significant vowel shifts and unusual consonant clusters. Unlike other dialect groups, in the Maghrebi Arabic group, first-person singular verbs begin with a n- (ن). Further substantial differences exist between Bedouin and sedentary speech, the countryside and major cities, ethnic groups, religious groups, social classes, men and women, and the young and the old. These differences are to some degree bridgeable. Often, Arabic speakers can adjust their speech in a variety of ways according to the context and to their intentions—for example, to speak with people from different regions, to demonstrate their level of education or to draw on the authority of the spoken language.

In terms of typological classification, Arabic dialectologists distinguish between two basic norms: Bedouin and Sedentary. This is based on a set of phonological, morphological, and syntactic characteristics that distinguish between these two norms. However, it is not really possible to maintain this classification, partly because the modern dialects, especially urban variants, typically amalgamate features from both norms. Geographically, modern Arabic varieties are classified into five groups: Maghrebi, Egyptian (including Egyptian and Sudanese), Mesopotamian, Levantine and Peninsular Arabic. Speakers from distant areas, across national borders, within countries and even between cities and villages, can struggle to understand each other's dialects.

== Classification ==
Geographical distribution of the varieties of Arabic (excluding Judeo-Arabic) per Ethnologue and other sources: 1: Hassaniyya; 2: Moroccan Arabic; 3: Algerian Saharan; 4: Algerian Arabic; 5: Tunisian Arabic; 6: Libyan Arabic; 7: Egyptian Arabic; 8: Eastern Egyptian Bedawi Arabic; 9: Saidi Arabic; 10: Chadian Arabic; 11: Sudanese Arabic; 12: Juba Arabic; 13: Najdi Arabic; 14: Levantine Arabic; 15: North Mesopotamian Arabic; 16: Mesopotamian Arabic; 17: Gulf Arabic; 18: Baharna Arabic; 19: Hijazi Arabic; 20: Shihhi Arabic; 21: Omani Arabic; 22: Dhofari Arabic; 23: Sanaani Arabic; 24: Ta'izzi-Adeni Arabic; 25: Hadrami Arabic; 26: Uzbeki Arabic; 27: Bactrian Arabic; 28: Cypriot Arabic; 29: Maltese; 30: Nubi; Sparsely populated area or no indigenous Arabic speakers; Solid area fill: Variety natively spoken by at least 25% of the population of that area or variety indigenous to that area only; Hatched area fill: Minority scattered over the area; Dotted area fill: Speakers of this variety are mixed with speakers of other Arabic varieties in the area

=== Regional varieties ===
The greatest variations between kinds of Arabic are those between regional language groups. Arabic dialectologists formerly distinguished between just two groups: the Mashriqi (eastern) dialects, east of Libya which includes the dialects of Arabian Peninsula, Mesopotamia, Levant, Egypt, Sudan, and the Maghrebi (western) dialects which includes the dialects of North Africa (Maghreb) west of Egypt. The mutual intelligibility is high within each of those two groups, while the intelligibility between the two groups is asymmetric: Maghrebi speakers are more likely to understand Mashriqi than vice versa.

Arab dialectologists have now adopted a more detailed classification for modern variants of the language, which is divided into five major groups: Peninsular, Mesopotamian, Levantine, Egypto-Sudanic or Nile Valley (including Egyptian and Sudanese), and Maghrebi.

These large regional groups do not correspond to borders of modern states. In the western parts of the Arab world, varieties are referred to as الدارجة ad-dārija, and in the eastern parts, as العامية al-ʿāmmiyya. Nearby varieties of Arabic are mostly mutually intelligible, but faraway varieties tend not to be. Varieties west of Egypt are particularly disparate, with Egyptian Arabic speakers claiming difficulty in understanding North African Arabic speakers, while North African Arabic speakers' ability to understand other Arabic speakers is mostly due to the widespread popularity of Egyptian and Levantine popular media (for example Syrian or Lebanese TV shows). This phenomenon is called asymmetric intelligibility.

One factor in the differentiation of the varieties is the influence from other languages (mainly other Afroasiatic languages) previously spoken or still presently spoken in the regions, such as

- Ancient Egyptian or Coptic in Egypt;
- Aramaic in the Levant;
- Aramaic, Akkadian, and Persian in Mesopotamia (Iraq);
- Berber, Spanish, French, and Italian in the Maghreb;
- Himyaritic, Modern South Arabian, and Old South Arabian in Yemen.

==== Maghrebi group ====
Maghrebi dialects are influenced by the Berber languages, as well as Spanish, French, and Italian due to these countries' long colonization of the region.

- Koines
  - Moroccan Arabic (الدارجة/مغربية – maḡribiyya/dārija) – (ISO 639–3: ary)
  - Algerian Arabic (الدارجة/دزيرية – dzīriyya/dārja) – (ISO 639–3: arq)
  - Tunisian Arabic (الدارجة/تونسي – tūnsi/dērja) – (ISO 639–3: aeb)
  - Libyan Arabic (الدارجة/ليبي – lībi/dārja) – (ISO 639–3: ayl)
- Pre-Hilalian
  - Ceuta Arabic (العربية السبتية)
  - Jebli Arabic
  - Jijel Arabic
  - Pre-Hilalian Urban Arabic
    - Fessi Arabic
  - Siculo-Arabic (صقلي – sīqīlli, extinct in Sicily) – (ISO 639–3: sqr) †
    - Maltese – (ISO 639–3: mlt)
- Bedouin
  - Algerian Saharan Arabic – (ISO 639–3: aao)
  - Hassaniya Arabic – (ISO 639–3: mey)
- Andalusian Arabic (أندلسي – andalūsi, extinct in Iberia, surviving among Andalusi communities in Morocco and Algeria) – (ISO 639–3: xaa) †

==== Sudanese group ====
Sudanese dialects are influenced by the various Nubian languages, and the Beja language.

- Sudanese Arabic (سوداني – sūdāni) – (ISO 639–3: apd)
  - Juba Arabic – (ISO 639–3: pga)
  - Turku Arabic, pidgin †

==== Egyptian group ====
Egyptian dialects are mainly influenced by the Coptic language.

- Egyptian Arabic (مصرى – maṣri) – (ISO 639–3: arz)
- Sa'idi Arabic (صعيدى – ṣaʿīdi) – (ISO 639–3: aec)

==== Chadian group ====
Chadian dialects are mainly influenced by local languages spoken in Chad and by French to a lesser extent.

- Chadian Arabic (ISO 639–3: shu), spoken by nomadic Arab tribes across Chad, Niger, Nigeria, and parts of Sudan.

==== Mesopotamian group ====
The two Mesopotamian dialects (spoken in Iraq and north-east Syria) are influenced by the various ancient Mesopotamian languages (mainly Sumerian, Akkadian, and Eastern Aramaic), as well as Persian and Ottoman Turkish.

- North Mesopotamian (qeltu varieties — ISO 639–3: acy)
  - Judeo-Iraqi Arabic – (ISO 639–3: yhd)
    - Baghdad Jewish Arabic
  - Anatolian Arabic
- South Mesopotamian (gilit varieties)
  - Marsh Arabic
  - Baghdadi Arabic – (ISO 639–3: acm)
  - Khuzestani Arabic
  - Shawi Arabic

==== Levantine group ====
Levantine varieties (ISO 639–3: apc) are influenced by Aramaic, and, to a lesser extent, Ottoman Turkish, Greek, Persian, and French due to the French mandate:

- Cilician Arabic (القيليقية)
- Jordanian Arabic (الأردنية)
- Lebanese Arabic (اللبنانية)
- Palestinian Arabic (الفلسطينية)
  - Fellahi Arabic (الفلاحي)
  - Madani Arabic (المدني)
- Syrian Arabic (السورية)
  - Damascene Arabic (الدمشقية)
  - Aleppo Arabic (الحلبية)

==== Peninsular group ====
The varieties of the Arabian peninsula are influenced by the South Arabian languages.

- Najdi Arabic (نجدي – najdi) – (ISO 639–3: ars)
- Gulf Arabic (خليجي – ḵalīji) – (ISO 639–3: afb)
- Bahrani Arabic (بحراني – baḥrāni) – (ISO 639–3: abv)
- Hejazi Arabic (حجازي – ḥijāzi) – (ISO 639–3: acw)
- Yemeni Arabic (يمني – yamani)
  - Hadhrami Arabic (حضرمي – ḥaḍrami) – (ISO 639–3: ayh)
    - Indonesian Arabic (إندونيسيا – 'iindunisia)
    - Mozambican Arabic (or also from the Omani branch)
  - Sanʽani Arabic – (ISO 639–3: ayn)
  - Taʽizzi-Adeni Arabic – (ISO 639–3: acq)
  - Tihamiyya Arabic
  - Yāfiʿī Arabic
- Omani Arabic (عماني – ʿumāni) – (ISO 639–3: acx)
- Dhofari Arabic – (ISO 639–3: adf)
- Shihhi Arabic (شحّي – šiḥḥi) – (ISO 639–3: ssh)
- Bareqi Arabic
- Bedawi Arabic (البدوية – badawi/bdiwi) – (ISO 639–3: avl)

==== Peripheries ====
- Central Asian Arabic
  - Bactrian Arabic – (ISO 639–3: abh)
  - Uzbeki Arabic – (ISO 639–3: auz)
  - Khorasani Arabic
- Shirvani Arabic †

=== Jewish varieties ===
Jewish varieties are influenced by the Hebrew and Aramaic languages. Though they have features similar to each other, they are not a homogeneous unit and still belong philologically to the same family groupings as their non-Judeo counterpart varieties.

- Judeo-Arabic (ISO 639–3: jrb)
  - Judeo-Algerian
  - Judeo-Egyptian
  - Judeo-Iraqi (ISO 639–3: yhd)
    - Judeo-Baghdadi
  - Judeo-Lebanese
  - Judeo-Moroccan (ISO 639–3: aju)
  - Judeo-Syrian
  - Judeo-Tripolitanian (ISO 639–3: yud)
  - Judeo-Tunisian
  - Judeo-Yemeni (ISO 639–3: jye)
  - Modern Palestinian Judeo-Arabic

=== Creoles and pidgins ===
There have been a number of Arabic-based pidgins and creoles throughout history, including a number of new ones emerging today. These may be broadly divided into the Sudanic pidgins and creoles, which share a common ancestry, and incipient immigrant pidgins.

==== Creoles ====
- Nubi – (ISO 639–3: kcn)

==== Pidgins ====
- Maridi Arabic (مريدي – mridi) †
- Bongor Arabic

=== Diglossic variety ===
- Modern Standard Arabic – (ISO 639–3: arb)

== Language mixing and change ==
Arabic is characterized by a wide number of varieties; however, Arabic speakers are often able to manipulate the way they speak based on the circumstances. There can be a number of motives for changing one's speech: the formality of a situation, the need to communicate with people with different dialects, to get social approval, to differentiate oneself from the listener, when citing a written text to differentiate between personal and professional or general matters, to clarify a point, and to shift to a new topic.

An important factor in the mixing or changing of Arabic is the concept of a prestige dialect. This refers to the level of respect accorded to a language or dialect within a speech community. The formal Arabic language carries a considerable prestige in most Arabic-speaking communities, depending on the context. This is not the only source of prestige, though. Many studies have shown that for most speakers, there is a prestige variety of vernacular Arabic. In Egypt, for non-Cairenes, the prestige dialect is Cairo Arabic. For Jordanian women from Bedouin or rural background, it may be the urban dialects of the big cities, especially including the capital Amman. Moreover, in certain contexts, a dialect relatively different from formal Arabic may carry more prestige than a dialect closer to the formal language—this is the case in Bahrain, for example.

Language mixes and changes in different ways. Arabic speakers often use more than one variety of Arabic within a conversation or even a sentence. This process is referred to as code-switching. For example, a woman on a TV program could appeal to the authority of the formal language by using elements of it in her speech in order to prevent other speakers from cutting her off. Another process at work is "leveling", the "elimination of very localised dialectical features in favour of more regionally general ones." This can affect all linguistic levels—semantic, syntactic, phonological, etc. The change can be temporary, as when a group of speakers with substantially different Arabics communicate, or it can be permanent, as often happens when people from the countryside move to the city and adopt the more prestigious urban dialect, possibly over a couple of generations.

This process of accommodation sometimes appeals to the formal language, but often does not. For example, villagers in central Palestine may try to use the dialect of Jerusalem rather than their own when speaking with people with substantially different dialects, particularly since they may have a very weak grasp of the formal language. In another example, groups of educated speakers from different regions will often use dialectical forms that represent a middle ground between their dialects rather than trying to use the formal language, to make communication easier and more comprehensible. For example, to express the existential "there is" (as in, "there is a place where..."), Arabic speakers have access to many different words:

- Iraq and Kuwait: /aku/
- Egypt, the Levant, and most of the Arabian Peninsula: /fiː/
- Tunisia: /famːa/
- Morocco and Algeria: /kajn/
- Yemen: /beh/
- Modern Standard Arabic: /hunaːk/

In this case, /fiː/ is most likely to be used as it is not associated with a particular region and is the closest to a dialectical middle ground for this group of speakers. Moreover, given the prevalence of movies and TV shows in Egyptian Arabic, the speakers are all likely to be familiar with it. Iraqi/Kuwaiti aku, Levantine fīh and North African kayn all evolve from Classical Arabic forms (yakūn, fīhi, kā'in respectively), but now sound different.

Sometimes a certain dialect may be associated with backwardness and does not carry mainstream prestige—yet it will continue to be used as it carries a kind of covert prestige and serves to differentiate one group from another when necessary.

== Sedentary and nomadic varieties ==
A basic distinction that cuts across the entire geography of the Arabic-speaking world is between sedentary and nomadic varieties (often misleadingly called Bedouin). The distinction stems from the settlement patterns in the wake of the Arab conquests. As regions were conquered, army camps were set up that eventually grew into cities, and settlement of the rural areas by nomadic Arabs gradually followed thereafter. In some areas, sedentary dialects are divided further into urban and rural variants.

The most obvious phonetic difference between the two groups is the pronunciation of the letter ق qaf, which is pronounced as a voiced /ɡ/ in the urban varieties of the Arabian Peninsula (e.g. the Hejazi dialect in the ancient cities of Mecca and Medina) as well as in the Bedouin dialects across all Arabic-speaking countries, but is voiceless mainly in post-Arabized urban centers as either /q/ (with [ɡ] being an allophone in a few words mostly in North African cities) or /ʔ/ (merging ⟨ق⟩ with ⟨ء⟩) in the urban centers of Egypt and the Levant. The latter were mostly Arabized after the Islamic Conquests.

The other major phonetic difference is that the rural varieties preserve the Classical Arabic (CA) interdentals /θ/ ث and /ð/ ذ, and merge the CA emphatic sounds /ɮˤ/ ض and /ðˤ/ ظ into /ðˤ/ rather than sedentary /dˤ/.

The most significant differences between rural Arabic and non-rural Arabic are in syntax. The sedentary varieties in particular share a number of common innovations from CA. This has led to the suggestion, first articulated by Charles Ferguson, that a simplified koiné language developed in the army staging camps in Iraq, whence the remaining parts of the modern Arab world were conquered.

In general, the rural varieties are more conservative than the sedentary varieties and the rural varieties within the Arabian peninsula are even more conservative than those elsewhere. Within the sedentary varieties, the western varieties (particularly, Moroccan Arabic) are less conservative than the eastern varieties.

A number of cities in the Arabic world speak a "Bedouin" variety, which acquires prestige in that context.

== Examples of major regional differences ==
The following example illustrates similarities and differences between the literary, standardized varieties, and major urban dialects of Arabic. Maltese, a highly divergent Siculo-Arabic language descended from Maghrebi Arabic is also provided.

True pronunciations differ; transliterations used approach an approximate demonstration. Also, the pronunciation of Modern Standard Arabic differs significantly from region to region.

Variety	I love reading a lot.	When I went to the library,	I only found this old book.	I wanted to read a book about the history of women in France.
Arabic	أَنَا أُحِبُّ القِرَاءَةَ كَثِيرًا	عِنْدَمَا ذَهَبْتُ إِلَى المَكْتَبَة	لَمْ أَجِد سِوَى هٰذَا الكِتَابِ القَدِيم	كُنْتُ أُرِيدُ أَنْ أَقْرَأَ كِتَابًا عَن تَارِيخِ المَرأَةِ فِي فَرَنسَا
Modern Standard Arabic	ʾana ʾuḥibbu‿l-qirāʾata kaṯīran [ʔana: ʔuħibːu‿lqiraːʔata kaθiːran]	ʿindamā ḏahabtu ʾila‿l-maktabah [ʕindamaː ðahabtu ʔila‿lmaktabah]	lam ʾaǧid siwā hāḏa‿l-kitābi‿l-qadīm [lam ʔad͡ʒid siwaː haːða‿lkitaːbi‿lqadiːm]	kuntu ʾurīdu an ʾaqraʾa kitāban ʿan tārīḫi‿l-marʾati fī faransā [kuntu ʔuriːdu ʔan ʔaqraʔa kitaːban ʕan taːriːχi‿lmarʔati fiː faransaː]
Maghrebi
Tunisian (Tunis)	nḥəbb năqṛa baṛʃa	wăqtəlli mʃit l-əl-măktba	ma-lqīt kān ha-lə-ktēb lə-qdīm	kənt nḥəbb năqṛa ktēb ʕla tērīḵ enssa fi fṛānsa
Algerian (Algiers)	ʔāna nḥəbb nəqṛa b-ez-zaf	ki rŭħt l-əl-măktaba	ma-lqīt ḡīr hād lə-ktāb lə-qdīm	kŭnt ḥayəb nəqṛa ktāb ʕla t-tārīḵ təʕ enssa fi fṛānsa
Moroccan (Casablanca)	ʔāna kanebɣi naqra b-ez-zāf	melli mʃīt el-maktaba	ma-lqīt ḡīr hād le-ktāb le-qdīm	kunt bāḡi naqra ktāb ʕla tārīḵ enssa fe-fransa
Hassaniya (Nouakchott)	ʔānə nəbqi ləgrāye ḥattə	līn gəst əl-məktəbə	ma jbart mahu ḏə ləktāb l-qadīm	kənt ndōr nəgra ktāb ʕan tārīḵ ləmra/ləʔləyāt və vrāns
Maltese	jien inħobb naqra ħafna	meta mort il-librerija	sibt biss dan il-ktieb il-qadim	ridt naqra ktieb dwar il-ġrajja tan-nisa fi Franza.
Egypto-Sudanic
Egyptian (Cairo)	ʔana baḥebb el-ʔerāya awi	lamma roḥt el-maktaba	ma-lʔet-ʃ ʔella l-ketāb el-ʔadīm da	kont ʕāyez ʔaʔra ketāb ʕan tarīḵ es-settāt fe faransa
Chadian Arabic	ʔana naḥib al-giraʔa ketir	lamma mšeyt al-maktaba	ma lagayt illa kitab gedim da	Kont ʕāyiz agra kitab ʕan tarīkh en-nisa' fi Faransa
Levantine
Northern Jordanian (Irbid)	ʔana/ʔani kṯīr baḥebb il-qirāʔa	lamma ruḥt ʕal-mektebe	ma lagēteʃ ʔilla ha-l-ktāb l-gadīm	kān baddi ʔagra ktāb ʕan tārīḵ l-mara b-faransa
Jordanian (Amman)	ʔana ktīr baḥebb il-qirāʔa	lamma ruḥt ʕal-mektebe	ma lagēt ʔilla hal-ktāb l-gadīm	kan beddi ʔaqraʔ ktāb ʕan tārīḵ l-mara b-faransa
Lebanese (Beirut)	ʔana ktīr bḥebb l-ʔ(i)rēye	lamma reḥt ʕal-makt(a)be	ma l(a)ʔēt ʔilla ha-le-ktēb l-ʔ(a)dīm	kēn badde ʔeʔra ktēb ʕan tērīḵ l-mara b-f(a)ransa
Syrian (Damascus)	ʔana ktīr bḥebb l-ʔraye	lamma reḥt ʕal-maktabe	ma laʔēt ʔilla ha-l-ktāb l-ʔdīm	kān biddi ʔra ktāb ʕan tārīḵ l-mara b-fransa
Mesopotamian
Mesopotamian (Baghdad)	ʔāni kulliš ʔaḥebb lu-qrāye	min reḥit lil-maktabe	ma ligēt ḡīr hāḏe l-ketab el-ʕatīg	redet ʔaqre ketāb ʕan tārīḵ l-imrayyāt eb-franse
Peninsular
Gulf (Kuwait)	ʔāna wāyid ʔaḥibb il-qirāʾa	lamman riḥt il-maktaba	ma ligēt ʔilla ha-l-kitāb il-qadīm	kint ʔabī ʔagra kitāb ʕan tārīḵ il-ḥarīm b-faransa
Hejazi (Jeddah)	ʔana marra ʔaḥubb al-girāya	lamma ruħt al-maktaba	ma ligīt ḡēr hāda l-kitāb al-gadīm	kunt ʔabḡa ʔaɡra kitāb ʕan tārīḵ al-ḥarīm fi faransa
Sanaani Arabic (Sanaa)	ʔana bajn ʔaḥibb el-gerāje gawi	ḥīn sert salā el-maktabe	ma legēt-ʃ ḏajje l-ketāb l-gadīm	kont aʃti ʔagra ketāb ʕan tarīḵ l-mare beh farānsa

=== Other regional differences ===
"Peripheral" varieties of Arabic – that is, varieties spoken in countries where Arabic is not a dominant language and a lingua franca (e.g., Turkey, Iran, Cyprus, Chad, Nigeria and Eritrea)– are particularly divergent in some respects, especially in their vocabularies, since they are less influenced by classical Arabic. However, historically they fall within the same dialect classifications as the varieties that are spoken in countries where Arabic is the dominant language. Because most of these peripheral dialects are located in Muslim majority countries, they are now influenced by Classical Arabic and Modern Standard Arabic, the Arabic varieties of the Qur'an and their Arabic-speaking neighbours, respectively.

Probably the most divergent non-creole Arabic variety is Cypriot Maronite Arabic, a nearly extinct variety that has been heavily influenced by Greek, and written in Greek and Latin alphabets.

Maltese is descended from Siculo-Arabic. Its vocabulary has acquired a large number of loanwords from Sicilian, Italian and more recently English, and it uses only a Latin-based alphabet. It is the only Semitic language among the official languages of the European Union.

Arabic-based pidgins (which have a limited vocabulary consisting mostly of Arabic words, but lack most Arabic morphological features) are in widespread use along the southern edge of the Sahara, and have been for a long time. In the eleventh century, the medieval geographer al-Bakri records a text in an Arabic-based pidgin, probably one that was spoken in the region corresponding to modern Mauritania. In some regions, particularly around South Sudan, the pidgins have creolized (see the list below).

Immigrant speakers of Arabic often incorporate a significant amount of vocabulary from the host-country language in their speech, in a situation analogous to Spanglish in the United States.

Even within countries where the official language is Arabic, different varieties of Arabic are spoken. For example, within Syria, the Arabic spoken in Homs is recognized as different from the Arabic spoken in Damascus, but both are considered to be varieties of "Levantine" Arabic. And within Morocco, the Arabic of the city of Fes is considered different from the Arabic spoken elsewhere in the country.

== Mutual intelligibility ==
Geographically distant colloquial varieties usually differ enough to be mutually unintelligible, and some linguists consider them distinct languages. However, research by Trentman & Shiri indicates a high degree of mutual intelligibility between closely related Arabic variants for native speakers listening to words, sentences, and texts; and between more distantly related dialects in interactional situations.

In cases when native speakers of different dialects of Arabic who are literate in Standard Arabic speak together, there is sometimes a linguistic phenomenon Arabic speakers describe as al-lahja al-baiḍāʾ (اللهجة البيضاء, lit. 'the white dialect') or al-lugha al-baiḍāʾ (اللغة البيضاء, lit. 'the white language'), in which the speakers use a register between Standard Arabic and vernacular Arabic for the sake of mutual intelligibility.

Egyptian Arabic is one of the most widely understood Arabic dialects (even outside the Arab world, due to sometimes also being used in Hollywood) due to the influence of the Egyptian media in the region in the 20th century, especially radio, television, and film.

== Formal and vernacular differences ==
Another way that varieties of Arabic differ is that some are formal and others are colloquial (that is, vernacular). There are two formal varieties, or اللغة الفصحى al-lugha(t) al-fuṣḥá, One of these, known in English as Modern Standard Arabic (MSA), is used in contexts such as writing, broadcasting, interviewing, and speechmaking. The other, Classical Arabic, is the language of the Qur'an. It is rarely used except in reciting the Qur'an or quoting older classical texts. (Arabic speakers typically do not make an explicit distinction between MSA and Classical Arabic.) Modern Standard Arabic was deliberately developed in the early part of the 19th century as a modernized version of Classical Arabic.

People often use a mixture of both colloquial and formal Arabic. For example, interviewers or speechmakers generally use MSA in asking prepared questions or making prepared remarks, then switch to a colloquial variety to add a spontaneous comment or respond to a question. The ratio of MSA to colloquial varieties depends on the speaker, the topic, and the situation—amongst other factors. Today even the least educated citizens are exposed to MSA through public education and exposure to mass media, and so tend to use elements of it in speaking to others. This is an example of what linguistics researchers call diglossia. See Linguistic register.

Arabic diglossia diagram according to El-Said Badawi a-b: fuṣḥā end c-d: colloquial (‘āmmiyya) end a-g-e and e-h-b: pure fuṣḥā c-g-f and f-h-d: pure colloquial e-g-f-h: overlap of fuṣḥā and colloquial a-g-c and b-h-d: foreign (dakhīl) influence

Egyptian linguist Al-Said Badawi proposed the following distinctions between the different "levels of speech" involved when speakers of Egyptian Arabic switch between vernacular and formal Arabic varieties:

- فصحى التراث fuṣḥá at-turāṯ, 'heritage classical': The Classical Arabic of Arab literary heritage and the Qur'an. This is primarily a written language, but it is heard in spoken form at the mosque or in religious programmes on television, but with a modernized pronunciation.
- فصحى العصر fuṣḥá al-ʿaṣr, 'contemporary classical' or 'modernized classical': This is what Western linguists call Modern Standard Arabic (MSA). It is a modification and simplification of Classical Arabic that was deliberately created for the modern age. Consequently, it includes many newly coined words, either adapted from Classical Arabic (much as European scholars during the Renaissance coined new English words by adapting words from Latin), or borrowed from foreign, chiefly European, languages. Although it is principally a written language, it is spoken when people read aloud from prepared texts. Highly skilled speakers can also produce it spontaneously, though this typically occurs only in the context of media broadcasts – particularly in talk and debate programs on pan-Arab television networks such as Al Jazeera and Al Arabiya – where the speakers want to be simultaneously understood by Arabic speakers in all the various countries where these networks' target audiences live. If highly skilled speakers use it spontaneously, it is spoken when Arabic speakers of different dialects communicate with each other. Commonly used as a written language, it is found in most books, newspapers, magazines, official documents, and reading primers for small children; it is also used as another version of literary form of the Qur'an and in modernized revisions of writings from Arab literary heritage.
- عامية المثقفين ʿāmmiyyat al-muṯaqqafīn, 'colloquial of the cultured' (also called Educated Spoken Arabic, Formal Spoken Arabic, or Spoken MSA by other authors): This is a vernacular dialect that has been heavily influenced by MSA, i.e. borrowed words from MSA (this is similar to the literary Romance languages, wherein scores of words were borrowed directly from Classical Latin); loanwords from MSA replace or are sometimes used alongside native words evolved from Classical Arabic in colloquial dialects. It tends to be used in serious discussions by well-educated people, but is generally not used in writing except informally. It includes a large number of foreign loanwords, chiefly relating to the technical and theoretical subjects it is used to discuss, sometimes used in non-intellectual topics. Because it can generally be understood by listeners who speak varieties of Arabic different from those of the speaker's country of origin, it is often used on television, and it is also becoming the language of instruction at universities.
- عامية المتنورين ʿāmmiyyat al-mutanawwarīn 'colloquial of the basically educated': This is the everyday language that people use in informal contexts, and that is heard on television when non-intellectual topics are being discussed. It is characterized, according to Badawi, by high levels of borrowing. Educated speakers usually code-switch between ʿāmmiyyat al-muṯaqqafīn and ʿāmmiyyat al-mutanawwarīn.
- عامية الأميين ʿāmmiyyat al-ʾummiyyīn, 'colloquial of the illiterates': This is very colloquial speech characterized by the absence of any influence from MSA and by relatively little foreign borrowing.

Almost everyone in Egypt is able to use more than one of these levels of speech, and people often switch between them, sometimes within the same sentence. This is generally true in other Arabic-speaking countries as well.

The spoken dialects of Arabic have occasionally been written, usually in the Arabic alphabet. Vernacular Arabic was first recognized as a written language distinct from Classical Arabic in 17th century Ottoman Egypt, when the Cairo elite began to trend towards colloquial writing. A record of the Cairo vernacular of the time is found in the dictionary compiled by Yusuf al-Maghribi. More recently, many plays and poems, as well as a few other works exist in Lebanese Arabic and Egyptian Arabic; books of poetry, at least, exist for most varieties. In Algeria, colloquial Maghrebi Arabic was taught as a separate subject under French colonization, and some textbooks exist. Mizrahi Jews throughout the Arab world who spoke Judeo-Arabic dialects rendered newspapers, letters, accounts, stories, and translations of some parts of their liturgy in the Hebrew alphabet, adding diacritics and other conventions for letters that exist in Judeo-Arabic but not Hebrew. The Latin alphabet was advocated for Lebanese Arabic by Said Aql, whose supporters published several books in his transcription. In 1944, Abdelaziz Pasha Fahmi, a member of the Academy of the Arabic Language in Egypt proposed the replacement of the Arabic alphabet with the Latin alphabet. His proposal was discussed in two sessions in the communion but was rejected, and faced strong opposition in cultural circles. The Latin alphabet (as "Arabizi") is used by Arabic speakers over the Internet or for sending messages via cellular phones when the Arabic alphabet is unavailable or difficult to use for technical reasons; this is also used in Modern Standard Arabic when Arabic speakers of different dialects communicate each other.

=== Linguistic distance to MSA ===
Three scientific papers concluded, using various natural language processing techniques, that Levantine dialects (and especially Palestinian) were the closest colloquial varieties, in terms of lexical similarity, to Modern Standard Arabic: Harrat et al. (2015, comparing MSA to two Algerian dialects, Tunisian, Palestinian, and Syrian), El-Haj et al. (2018, comparing MSA to Egyptian, Levantine, Gulf, and North African Arabic), and Abu Kwaik et al. (2018, comparing MSA to Algerian, Tunisian, Palestinian, Syrian, Jordanian, and Egyptian).

== Sociolinguistic variables ==
Sociolinguistics is the study of how language usage is affected by societal factors, e.g., cultural norms and contexts (see also pragmatics). The following sections examine some of the ways that modern Arab societies influence how Arabic is spoken.

=== Religion ===
In the Arab world, religion transcends the boundaries of personal belief, functioning as a pervasive and influential force in every facet of life. It is deeply embedded within the social fabric, permeating language, politics, and cultural identity. From birth, individuals are not only given a name but are also ascribed a place within a specific religious order: whether as Muslims, divided into Sunni or Shia, or as Christians, Druze, or Jews. These religious identities are not fluid or optional; rather, they are firmly entrenched, shaping and defining the individual’s experience. Even language itself is moulded by this religious framework, reflecting the collective identity and adjusting to the intricate balance of belief systems. Religion in this context functions as a sociopolitical construct, inextricably linked to the authority of the state and its historical evolution. It speaks for the individual, often before they can express themselves, and thus, the interplay between faith and politics must be fully understood to grasp the complexities of the language and culture of the Arab world. Religion and politics here are intertwined to such a degree that they cannot be separated.

Bahrain offers a clear example of the intricate relationship between religion, identity, and societal structures in the Arab world. A significant distinction exists between the Shiite population, Bahrain's oldest and most established community, and the Sunni population, which began migrating to the island in the 18th century. Despite being a minority, the Sunni population holds a dominant position, with the ruling family of Bahrain being Sunni. This dominance is reflected in the public sphere, where the colloquial language presented on television and in media is almost exclusively that of the Sunni community. As a result, power, prestige, and economic control are closely associated with the Sunni Arabs. This socio-political dynamic exerts a profound influence on the evolution of language in Bahrain, steering its development in line with the interests and cultural practices of the Sunni minority.

The case of Iraq further exemplifies how religious affiliation can significantly influence linguistic variation within the Arab world. This observation is drawn from a study conducted prior to the Iraq War and the mass emigration of Iraqi Christians in the early 21st century. In Baghdad, notable differences exist between the Arabic spoken by Christian and Muslim residents. The Christian community in Baghdad is longstanding, and their dialect traces its roots to the sedentary vernacular of urban medieval Iraq. By contrast, the typical Muslim dialect of the city is a more recent development, originating from Bedouin speech patterns. As in other parts of the Arab world, both communities in Baghdad share Modern Standard Arabic (MSA) as the prestigious form of the language. However, the Muslim colloquial dialect is more closely associated with power and economic dominance, reflecting the greater influence of the Muslim community in the city. Consequently, Christians often adopt the Muslim dialect in formal or public contexts—such as a Christian school teacher addressing students—demonstrating the extent to which language in Baghdad, and the wider Arab world, is shaped by the prevailing sociopolitical landscape.

== Variation ==
=== Writing system ===
Different regional representations for some phonemes
Native Phonemes	Moroccan	Tunisian	Algerian	Hejazi	Najdi	Egyptian	Levantine	Iraqi	Gulf
Native Phonemes	Letters								
/ɡ/	ڭ / ك / گ / ق / ج	ڨ / ق		ق		ج^{(Note: In Egypt, when there is a need to transcribe /ʒ/ or (also a reduction of /d͡ʒ/), is approximated to [ʒ] using چ.)}	ق / غ / ج / ك^{(Note: While /g/ occurs natively in most of southern Levant, including most of Jordan (Amman, Zarqa, Irbid), parts of Palestine (Gaza and the Naqab) and parts of eastern Syria (Deir ez-Zor and Raqqa), it is not a native sound in most of the northern and western Levant, which includes the historically most important urban centers of Lebanon, Palestine and Syria (Beirut, Damascus, Jerusalem and also Aleppo, Haifa, Hama, Homs, etc.); still, most if not all Levantine speakers are able to pronounce it.)}	گ / ك / ق	ق / گ
/t͡ʃ/^{(Note: /t͡ʃ/ is a native phoneme/allophone only in Iraqi, Gulf and some rural Levantine dialects, and foreign in most other dialects.)}	تش							چ	
Foreign Phonemes^{(Note: The sounds /p/ and /v/ are non-native to Standard, Classical and Arabic dialects (excl. Anatolian Arabic where ذِئْب "Wolf" is pronounced vīp [viːp] instead of Standard Arabic [ðɪʔb]), while /g/, /t͡ʃ/ and /ʒ/ appear as a native phoneme or allophone in many dialects.)}	Letters								
/p/	پ / ب								
/v/	ڥ / ڢ / ف			ڤ / ف					

=== Morphology and syntax ===
All varieties, sedentary and nomadic, differ in the following ways from Classical Arabic (CA)

- The order subject–verb–object may be more common than verb–subject–object.
- Verbal agreement between subject and object is always complete.
  - In CA, there was no number agreement between subject and verb when the subject was third-person and the subject followed the verb.
- Loss of case distinctions (ʾIʿrab).
- Loss of original mood distinctions other than the indicative and imperative (i.e., subjunctive, jussive, energetic I, energetic II).
  - The dialects differ in how exactly the new indicative was developed from the old forms. The sedentary dialects adopted the old subjunctive forms (feminine /iː/, masculine plural /uː/), while many of the Bedouin dialects adopted the old indicative forms (feminine /iːna/, masculine plural /uːna/).
  - The sedentary dialects subsequently developed new mood distinctions; see below.
- Loss of dual marking everywhere except on nouns.
  - A frozen dual persists as the regular plural marking of a small number of words that normally come in pairs (e.g., eyes, hands, parents).
  - In addition, a productive dual marking on nouns exists in most dialects (Tunisian and Moroccan Arabic are exceptions). This dual marking differs syntactically from the frozen dual in that it cannot take possessive suffixes. In addition, it differs morphologically from the frozen dual in various dialects, such as Levantine Arabic.
  - The productive dual differs from CA in that its use is optional, whereas the use of the CA dual was mandatory even in cases of implicitly dual reference.
  - The CA dual was marked not only on nouns, but also on verbs, adjectives, pronouns and demonstratives; the dual in those varieties that have them is analyzed as plural for agreement with verbs, adjectives, pronouns, and demonstratives.
- Development of an analytic genitive construction with the usage of حق ḥagg, بتاع bitāʕ, تاع tāʕ, ديال diyāl etc. to rival the constructed genitive.
  - The Bedouin dialects make the least use of the analytic genitive. Moroccan Arabic makes the most use of it, to the extent that the constructed genitive is no longer productive, and used only in certain relatively frozen constructions.
- The relative pronoun is no longer inflected.
  - In CA, it took gender, number and case endings.
- Pronominal clitics ending in a short vowel moved the vowel before the consonant.
  - Hence, second singular /-ak/ and /-ik/ rather than /-ka/ and /-ki/; third singular masculine /-uh/ rather than /-hu/.
  - Similarly, the feminine plural verbal marker /-na/ became /-an/.
  - Because of the absolute prohibition in all Arabic dialects against having two vowels in hiatus, the above changes occurred only when a consonant preceded the ending. When a vowel preceded, the forms either remained as-is or lost the final vowel, becoming /-k/, /-ki/, /-h/ and /-n/, respectively. Combined with other phonetic changes, this resulted in multiple forms for each clitic (up to three), depending on the phonetic environment.
  - The verbal markers /-tu/ (first singular) and /-ta/ (second singular masculine) both became /-t/, while second singular feminine /-ti/ remained. Mesopotamian dialects in southeastern Turkey are an exception for they retain the ending /-tu/ for first person singular.
  - In the dialect of southern Nejd (including Riyadh), the second singular masculine /-ta/ has been retained, but takes the form of a long vowel rather than a short one as in CA.
  - The forms given here were the original forms, and have often suffered various changes in the modern dialects.
  - All of these changes were triggered by the loss of final short vowels (see below).
- Various simplifications have occurred in the range of variation in verbal paradigms.
  - Third-weak verbs with radical /w/ and radical /j/ (traditionally transliterated y) have merged in the form I perfect tense. They had already merged in CA, except in form I.
  - Form I perfect faʕula verbs have disappeared, often merging with faʕila.
  - Doubled verbs now have the same endings as third-weak verbs.
  - Some endings of third-weak verbs have been replaced by those of the strong verbs (or vice versa, in some dialects).

All dialects except some Bedouin dialects of the Arabian peninsula share the following innovations from CA

- Loss of the inflected passive (i.e., marked through internal vowel change) in finite verb forms.
  - New passives have often been developed by co-opting the original reflexive formations in CA, particularly verb forms V, VI and VII (In CA these were derivational, not inflectional, as neither their existence nor exact meaning could be depended upon; however, they have often been incorporated into the inflectional system, especially in more innovative sedentary dialects).
  - Hassaniya Arabic contains a newly developed inflected passive that looks somewhat like the old CA passive.
  - Najdi Arabic has retained the inflected passive up to the modern era, though this feature is on its way to extinction as a result of the influence of other dialects.
- Loss of the indefinite /n/ suffix (tanwiin) on nouns.
  - When this marker still appears, it is variously /an/, /in/, or /en/.
  - In some Bedouin dialects it still marks indefiniteness on any noun, although this is optional and often used only in oral poetry.
  - In other dialects it marks indefiniteness on post-modified nouns (by adjectives or relative clauses).
  - All Arabic dialects preserve a form of the CA adverbial accusative /an/ suffix, which was originally a tanwiin marker.
- Loss of verb form IV, the causative.
  - Verb form II sometimes gives causatives, but is not productive.
- Uniform use of /i/ in imperfect verbal prefixes.
  - CA had /u/ before form II, III and IV active, and before all passives, and /a/ elsewhere.
  - Some Bedouin dialects in the Arabian peninsula have uniform /a/.
  - Najdi Arabic has /a/ when the following vowel is /i/, and /i/ when the following vowel is /a/.

All sedentary dialects share the following additional innovations

- Loss of a separately distinguished feminine plural in verbs, pronouns and demonstratives. This is usually lost in adjectives as well.
- Development of a new indicative-subjunctive distinction.
  - The indicative is marked by a prefix, while the subjunctive lacks this.
  - The prefix is /b/ or /bi/ in Egyptian Arabic and Levantine Arabic, but /ka/ or /ta/ in Moroccan Arabic. It is not infrequent to encounter /ħa/ as an indicative prefix in some Persian Gulf states; and, in South Arabian Arabic (viz. Yemen), /ʕa/ is used in the north around the San'aa region, and /ʃa/ is used in the southwest region of Ta'iz.
  - Tunisian Arabic, Maltese and at least some varieties of Algerian and Libyan Arabic lack an indicative prefix. Rural dialects in Tunisia however, may use /ta/.
- Loss of /h/ in the third-person masculine enclitic pronoun, when attached to a word ending in a consonant.
  - The form is usually /u/ or /o/ in sedentary dialects, but /ah/ or /ih/ in Bedouin dialects.
  - After a vowel, the bare form /h/ is used, but in many sedentary dialects the /h/ is lost here as well. In Egyptian Arabic, for example, this pronoun is marked in this case only by lengthening of the final vowel and concomitant stress shift onto it, but the "h" reappears when followed by another suffix.
    - ramā "he threw it"
    - maramahūʃ "he didn't throw it"

The following innovations are characteristic of many or most sedentary dialects

- Agreement (verbal, adjectival) with inanimate plurals is plural, rather than feminine singular or feminine plural, as in CA.
- Development of a circumfix negative marker on the verb, involving a prefix /ma-/ and a suffix /-ʃ/.
  - In combination with the fusion of the indirect object and the development of new mood markers, this results in morpheme-rich verbal complexes that can approach polysynthetic languages in their complexity.
  - An example from Egyptian Arabic:
    - /ma-bi-t-ɡib-u-ha-lnaː-ʃ/
    - [negation]-[indicative]-[2nd.person.subject]-bring-[feminine.object]-to.us-[negation]
    - "You (plural) aren't bringing her (them) to us."
  - (NOTE: Versteegh glosses /bi/ as continuous.)
- In Egyptian, Tunisian and Moroccan Arabic, the distinction between active and passive participles has disappeared except in form I and in some Classical borrowings.
  - These dialects tend to use form V and VI active participles as the passive participles of forms II and III.

The following innovations are characteristic of Maghrebi Arabic (in North Africa, west of Egypt)

- In the imperfect, Maghrebi Arabic has replaced first person singular /ʔ-/ with /n-/, and the first person plural, originally marked by /n-/ alone, is also marked by the /-u/ suffix of the other plural forms.
- Moroccan Arabic has greatly rearranged the system of verbal derivation, so that the traditional system of forms I through X is not applicable without some stretching. It would be more accurate to describe its verbal system as consisting of two major types, triliteral and quadriliteral, each with a mediopassive variant marked by a prefixal /t-/ or /tt-/.
  - The triliteral type encompasses traditional form I verbs (strong: /ktəb/ "write"; geminate: /ʃəmm/ "smell"; hollow: /biʕ/ "sell", /qul/ "say", /xaf/ "fear"; weak /ʃri/ "buy", /ħbu/ "crawl", /bda/ "begin"; irregular: /kul/-/kla/ "eat", /ddi/ "take away", /ʒi/ "come").
  - The quadriliteral type encompasses strong [CA form II, quadriliteral form I]: /sˤrˤfəq/ "slap", /hrrəs/ "break", /hrnən/ "speak nasally"; hollow-2 [CA form III, non-CA]: /ʕajən/ "wait", /ɡufəl/ "inflate", /mixəl/ "eat" (slang); hollow-3 [CA form VIII, IX]: /xtˤarˤ/ "choose", /ħmarˤ/ "redden"; weak [CA form II weak, quadriliteral form I weak]: /wrri/ "show", /sˤqsˤi/ "inquire"; hollow-2-weak [CA form III weak, non-CA weak]: /sali/ "end", /ruli/ "roll", /tiri/ "shoot"; irregular: /sˤifətˤ/-/sˤafətˤ/ "send".
  - There are also a certain number of quinquiliteral or longer verbs, of various sorts, e.g. weak: /pidˤali/ "pedal", /blˤani/ "scheme, plan", /fanti/ "dodge, fake"; remnant CA form X: /stəʕməl/ "use", /stahəl/ "deserve"; diminutive: /t-birˤʒəz/ "act bourgeois", /t-biznəs/ "deal in drugs".
  - Those types corresponding to CA forms VIII and X are rare and completely unproductive, while some of the non-CA types are productive. At one point, form IX significantly increased in productivity over CA, and there are perhaps 50–100 of these verbs currently, mostly stative but not necessarily referring to colors or bodily defects. However, this type is no longer very productive.
  - Due to the merging of short /a/ and /i/, most of these types show no stem difference between perfect and imperfect, which is probably why the languages has incorporated new types so easily.

The following innovations are characteristic of Egyptian Arabic

- Egyptian Arabic, probably under the influence of Coptic, puts the demonstrative pronoun after the noun (/al-X da/ "this X" instead of CA /haːðaː l-X/) and leaves interrogative pronouns in situ rather than fronting them, as in other dialects.

=== Phonetics ===
When it comes to phonetics the Arabic dialects differ in the pronunciation of the short vowels (/a/, /u/ and /i/) and a number of selected consonants, mainly ⟨ق⟩ /q/, ⟨ج⟩ /d͡ʒ/ and the interdentals ⟨ث⟩ /θ/, ⟨ذ⟩ /ð/ and ⟨ظ⟩ /ðˤ/, in addition to the dental ⟨ض⟩ /dˤ/. The ⟨ك⟩ /k/ is sometimes palatalized depending on its position in a number of dialects:

Letter	Standard Arabic Pronunciation	Dialectal Main Variations			Less Common Variations				
ق	/q/	[q]	[ɡ]	[ʔ]	[ɢ]	[k]	[d͡z]	[d͡ʒ]	[ɣ]
ج	/d͡ʒ/	[d͡ʒ]	[ʒ]	[ɡ]	[ɟ]	[j]	[d͡z]	[d]	
ك	/k/	[k]			[t͡ʃ]	[t͡s]	[ʃ]	[s]	
ض	/dˤ/	[dˤ]	[ðˤ]		[d]	[zˤ]	[tˤ]		
ظ	/ðˤ/	[ðˤ]	[dˤ]	[zˤ]	[d]				
ذ	/ð/	[ð]	[d]	[z]	[v]				
ث	/θ/	[θ]	[t]	[s]	[f]				

==== Emphasis spreading ====
Emphasis spreading is a phenomenon where /a/ is backed to [ɑ] in the vicinity of emphatic consonants. The domain of emphasis spreading is potentially unbounded; in Egyptian Arabic, the entire word is usually affected, although in Levantine Arabic and some other varieties, it is blocked by /i/ or /j/ (and sometimes /ʃ/). It is associated with a concomitant decrease in the amount of pharyngealization of emphatic consonants, so that in some dialects emphasis spreading is the only way to distinguish emphatic consonants from their plain counterparts. It also pharyngealizes consonants between the source consonant and affected vowels, although the effects are much less noticeable than for vowels. Emphasis spreading does not affect the affrication of non-emphatic /t/ in Moroccan Arabic, with the result that these two phonemes are always distinguishable regardless of the nearby presence of other emphatic phonemes.

==== Consonants (capital city for nation unless stated otherwise) ====
Letter	Dialect group	Levantine		Nilo-Egyptian		Peninsular			Mesopotamian		Maghrebi			
Letter	Modern Standard	Jordan	Syria, Lebanon, Palestine	Egypt	Egypt (Sohag)	Saudia Arabia (Jeddah)	Saudi Arabia	Kuwaiti	Iraq	Iraq (Mosul)	Tunisia	Algeria	Algieria (Oran)	Moroccan (Urban)
ق	/q/	[ɡ], [ʔ]	[ʔ]		[ɡ]		[ɡ], [d͡z]**	[ɡ], [d͡ʒ]	[ɡ], [q], [d͡ʒ], [k]	[q] (in some words [g])				
ج	/d͡ʒ/*	[d͡ʒ]	[ʒ]	[ɡ]	[d͡ʒ]			[d͡ʒ], [j]			[ʒ]	[d͡ʒ]	[ʒ]	[ʒ], [ɡ]***
ث	/θ/	[t],[s]				[t], [s], [θ]	[θ]					[θ], [t]	[t]	
ذ	/ð/	[d],[z]				[d], [z], [ð]	[ð]					[d]		
ظ	/ðˤ/	[dˤ], [zˤ]				[dˤ], [zˤ], [ðˤ]	[ðˤ]					[dˤ]		
ض	/dˤ/	[dˤ]					[ðˤ]					[dˤ]		
ك	/k/	[k]					[k], [t͡s]**, [s]**	[k], [t͡ʃ]			[k]			

Notes:

- The pronunciation of standard ⟨ج⟩ depends on the region or the country, but /d͡ʒ/ is the predominant pronunciation outside the Arab world and the only accepted pronunciation for Quranic recitation, the other common pronunciations are [ɡ], [ʒ] or [ɟ].
- The usage of the sounds [d͡z] for ⟨ق⟩ and [t͡s] or [s] for ⟨ك⟩ are more common in the traditional Najdi dialects.
- Moroccan ⟨ج⟩ /ʒ/ is sometimes pronounced /g/ in some words as in جلس [gləs] "He sat".

Most dialects of Arabic will use [q] for ⟨ق⟩ in learned words that are borrowed from Standard Arabic into the respective dialect or when Arabs speak Modern Standard Arabic.

The main dialectal variations in Arabic consonants revolve around the consonants ⟨ج⟩, ⟨ق⟩, ⟨ث⟩, ⟨ذ⟩, ⟨ض⟩, ⟨ظ⟩ and partially ⟨ك⟩.

Classical Arabic ⟨ق⟩ /q/ varies widely from a dialect to another with [ɡ], [q] and [ʔ] being the most common:

- [ɡ] in most of the Arabian Peninsula, Northern and Eastern Yemen and parts of Oman, Southern Iraq, some parts of the Levant, Upper Egypt, Sudan, Libya, Mauritania, Chad and to lesser extent in some parts (mostly rural) of Tunisia, Algeria, and Morocco, but it is also used partially across those countries in some words.
- [q] in most of Tunisia, Algeria and Morocco, Southern and Western Yemen and parts of Oman, Northern Iraq, parts of the Levant, especially Druze dialects. However, most other dialects of Arabic will use this pronunciation in learned words that are borrowed from Standard Arabic into the respective dialect.
- [ʔ] in most of the Levant and Lower Egypt, as well as some North African towns such as Tlemcen and Fez.
- other variations include [ɢ] in Sudanese and some forms of Yemeni, [k] In rural Palestinian, [d͡ʒ] in some positions in Iraqi and Gulf Arabic, [ɣ] or [ʁ] in some positions in Sudanese and consonantally in the Yemeni dialect of Yafi', [d͡z] in some positions in Najdi, though this pronunciation is fading in favor of [ɡ].

Classical Arabic ⟨ج⟩ /ɟ/ (Modern Standard /d͡ʒ/) varies widely from a dialect to another with [d͡ʒ], [ʒ] and [ɡ] being the most common:

- [d͡ʒ] in most of the Arabian peninsula, Algeria, Iraq, Upper Egypt, Sudan, parts of the Levant and Yemen.
- [ʒ] in most of the Levant and North Africa.
- [ɡ] in Lower Egypt, parts of Yemen and Oman.
- other variations include [j] in the Persian Gulf and southern Iraq and coastal Hadhramaut. [ɡʲ] in some Arabian Bedouin dialects, and parts of Sudan, as the 8th-century Persian linguist Sibawayh described it.

Classical interdental consonants ⟨ث⟩ /θ/ and ⟨ذ⟩ /ð/ become /t, d/ or /s, z/ in some words in Egypt, Sudan, most of the Levant, parts of the Arabian peninsula (urban Hejaz and parts of Yemen). In Morocco, Algeria and other parts of North Africa they are consistently /t, d/. They remain /θ/ and /ð/ in most of the Arabian Peninsula, Iraq, Tunisia, parts of Yemen, rural Palestinian, Eastern Libyan, and some rural Algerian dialects. In Arabic-speaking towns of Eastern Turkey (Urfa, Siirt and Mardin), they respectively become /f, v/.

Reflexes of Classical /q/
Place	Reflex	/ˈqalb/	/baqara/	/ˈwaqt/	/ˈqaːl/	/ˈqamar/	/ˈqahwa/	/quddaːm/
Place	Reflex	"heart"	"cow"	"time"	"said"	"moon"	"coffee"	"in front of"
Medina, Hejazi Arabic	[ɡ]	galb	bagara	wagt	gāl	gamar	gahwa	guddām
Uzbeki Arabic (Jugari)	[q], occ. [ɡ]	qalb	baqara	waqt, (waḥt)	qāl	qamar	—	giddām
Kuwait City, Kuwait	[q] or [ɡ], occ. [d͡ʒ]	gaḷb	bgara	wakt (sporadic)	gāl	gumar	gahwa	jiddām
Muslim Baghdad Arabic	[ɡ], occ. [d͡ʒ]	gaḷuḅ	baqare	wakət	gāl	gumar	gahwe	guddām, jiddām
Baghdadi Judeo-Arabic	[q], occ. [d͡ʒ]	qalb	—	—	qāl	qamaɣ	—	jeddām
Mosul, Iraq	[q]	qʌləb	bʌgʌɣa	wʌqət	qāl	qʌmʌɣ	qʌhwi	qəddām
Anah, Iraq	[q] or [ɡ]	qālb	(bagra)	waqet	qāl	—	gahwa	—
Rural South Mesopotamian Arabic	[ɡ], occ. [d͡ʒ]	galub	bgure, bagre	wakit	gāl	gumar	ghawe, gahwe	jiddām
Judeo-Iraqi Arabic	[q]	qalb	baqaṛa	waqt, waxt	qāl	qamaṛ	qahwe	qǝddām
Mardin, Anatolia	[q]	qalb	baqaṛe	waqt, waxt	qāl	qumaṛ	qaḥwe	qǝddām
Sheep nomads, S Mesopotamia, NE Arabian Peninsula	[ɡ], occ. [d͡ʒ]	galb, galub	bgara	wagt, wakit	gāl	gamar	ghawa	jeddām
Camel nomads, SE Mesopotamia, NE Arabian Peninsula	[ɡ], occ. [d͡z]	galb, galub	bgara	wagt, wakit	gāl	gamar	ghawa	dᶻöddām
Aleppo, Syria	[ʔ]	ʾalb	baʾara	waʾt	ʾāl	ʾamar	ʾahwe	ʾǝddām
Damascus, Syria	[ʔ]	ʾalb	baʾara	waʾt	ʾāl	ʾamar	ʾahwe	ʾǝddām
Beirut, Lebanon	[ʔ]	ʾalb	baʾra	waʾt	ʾāl	ʾamar	ʾahwe	ʾǝddeem
Amman, Jordan	[ɡ] or [ʔ]	gaḷib or ʾalib	bagara or baʾ ara	wagǝt or waʾǝt	gāl or ʾāl	gamar or ʾamar	gahweh or ʾahweh	giddām or ʾiddām
Irbid, Jordan	[ɡ]	galib	bagara	waket	gāl	gamar	gahwe – gahweh	giddām
Sweida, Syria	[q]	qalb	baqara	—	qāl	qamar	qahwe	—
Nazareth, Israel	[ʔ] or [k]	ʾalb (or kalb)	baʾara (or bakara)	waʾt (or wakt)	ʾāl (or kāl)	ʾamar (or kamar)	ʾahwe (or kahwe)	ʾuddām (or kuddām)
Jerusalem (urban Palestinian Arabic)	[ʔ]	ʾalb	baʾara	waʾt	ʾāl	ʾamar	ʾahwe	ʾuddām
Bir Zeit, West Bank	[k]	kalb	bakara	wakt	kāl	kamar	kahwe	kuddām
Sanaa, Yemen	[ɡ]	galb	bagara	wagt	gāl	gamar	gahweh	guddām
Cairo, Egypt	[ʔ]	ʾalb	baʾara	waʾt	ʾāl	ʾamar	ʾahwa	ʾuddām
Upper Egypt, Sa'idi Arabic	[ɡ]	galb	bagara	wagt	gāl	gamar	gahwa	guddām
Sudan	[ɡ]	galib	bagara	wagt	gāl	gamra	gahwa, gahawa	giddām
Ouaddaï, Chad	[ɡ], occ. [q]	—	beger	waqt	gāl	gamra	gahwa	—
Benghazi, E. Libya	[ɡ]	gaḷǝb	ǝbgǝ́ṛa	wagǝt	gāḷ	gǝmaṛ	gahawa	giddām
Tripoli, Libya	[g]	galb	bugra	wagǝt	gāl	gmar	gahwa	giddam
Tunis, Tunisia	[q], occ. [ɡ]	qalb	bagra	waqt	qal	gamra, qamra	qahwa	qoddem
El Hamma de Gabes, Tunisia	[ɡ]	gal^{a}b	bagra	wagt	gal	gamra	gahwa	geddem
Marazig, Tunisia	[ɡ], occ. [q]	galab	bagra	wagt	gal	gamra	gahwa, qahwa	qoddem, geddem
Algiers, Algeria	[q], occ. [ɡ]	qǝlb	bagra	waqt	qal	qamar, gamra	qahǝwa	qoddam
Sétif, Algeria	[ɡ]	gǝlb	bagra	waqt	gal	gmar	qahwa	guddam
Jijel Arabic (Algeria)	[k]	kǝlb	bekra	wǝkt	kal	kmǝr	kahwa	kǝddam
Rabat, Morocco	[q], occ. [ɡ]	qǝlb	bgar	waqt	qal, gal	qamar, gamra	qahǝwa	qǝddam, gǝddam
Casablanca, Morocco	[q], occ. [ɡ]	qǝlb	bgar	waqt	gal	qǝmr, gamra	qahǝwa	qoddam
North Tangier, Morocco	[q]	qǝlb	bqar	waqt,	qal	gǝmra	qahǝwa	qoddam
Jewish Moroccans (Judeo-Arabic)	[q]	qǝlb	bqar	wǝqt	qal	qmǝr	qǝhwa	qǝddam
Maltese	[ʔ] (written q)	qalb	baqra	waqt	qal	qamar	—	quddiem
Cypriot Maronite Arabic	[k] occ. [x]	kalp	pakar	oxt	kal	kamar	—	kintám
Andalusian Arabic	[q]	qalb	baqar	waqt	qal	qamar	—	quddām

- CA /ʔ/ is lost.
  - When adjacent to vowels, the following simplifications take place, in order:
    - V_{1}ʔV_{2} → V̄ when V_{1} = V_{2}
    - aʔi aʔw → aj aw
    - iʔV uʔV → ijV uwV
    - VʔC → V̄C
    - Elsewhere, /ʔ/ is simply lost.
  - In CA and Modern Standard Arabic (MSA), /ʔ/ is still pronounced.
  - Because this change had already happened in Meccan Arabic at the time the Qur'an was written, it is reflected in the orthography of written Arabic, where a diacritic known as hamzah is inserted either above an ʾalif, wāw or yāʾ, or "on the line" (between characters); or in certain cases, a diacritic ʾalif maddah (" ʾalif") is inserted over an ʾalif. (As a result, proper spelling of words involving /ʔ/ is probably one of the most difficult issues in Arabic orthography
  - Modern dialects have smoothed out the morphophonemic variations, typically by losing the associated verbs or moving them into another paradigm (for example, /qaraʔ/ "read" becomes /qara/ or /ʔara/, a third-weak verb).
  - /ʔ/ has reappeared medially in various words due to borrowing from CA. (In addition, /q/ has become [ʔ] in many dialects, although the two are marginally distinguishable in Egyptian Arabic, since words beginning with original /ʔ/ can elide this sound, whereas words beginning with original /q/ cannot.)
- CA /k/ often becomes [t͡ʃ] in the Persian Gulf, Iraq, some Rural Palestinian dialects and in some Bedouin dialects when adjacent to an original /i/, particularly in the second singular feminine enclitic pronoun, where [t͡ʃ] replaces Classical /ik/ or /ki/). In a very few Moroccan varieties, it affricates to /k͡ʃ/. Elsewhere, it remains [k].
- CA /r/ is pronounced [ʀ] in a few areas: Mosul, for instance, and the Jewish variety in Algiers. In all of northern Africa, a phonemic distinction has emerged between plain [r] and emphatic [rˤ], thanks to the merging of short vowels.
- CA /t/ (but not emphatic CA /tˤ/) is affricated to [t͡s] in Moroccan Arabic; this is still distinguishable from the sequence [ts].
- CA /ʕ/) is pronounced in Iraqi Arabic and Kuwaiti Arabic with glottal closure: [ʔˤ]. In some varieties /ʕ/ is devoiced to [ħ] before /h/, for some speakers of Cairene Arabic /bitaʕha/ → /bitaħħa/ (or /bitaʕ̞ħa/) "hers". The residue of this rule applies also in the Maltese language, where neither etymological /h/ nor /ʕ/ are pronounced as such, but give [ħ] in this context: tagħha [taħħa] "hers".
- The nature of "emphasis" differs somewhat from variety to variety. It is usually described as a concomitant pharyngealization, but in most sedentary varieties is actually velarization, or a combination of the two. (The phonetic effects of the two are only minimally different from each other.) Usually there is some associated lip rounding; in addition, the stop consonants /t/ and /d/ are dental and lightly aspirated when non-emphatic, but alveolar and completely unaspirated when emphatic.
- CA /r/ is also in the process of splitting into emphatic and non-emphatic varieties, with the former causing emphasis spreading, just like other emphatic consonants. Originally, non-emphatic [r] occurred before /i/ or between /i/ and a following consonant, while emphatic [rˤ] occurred mostly near [ɑ].
  - To a large extent, Western Arabic dialects reflect this, while the situation is rather more complicated in Egyptian Arabic. (The allophonic distribution still exists to a large extent, although not in any predictable fashion; nor is one or the other variety used consistently in different words derived from the same root. Furthermore, although derivational suffixes (in particular, relational /-i/ and /-ijja/) affect a preceding /r/ in the expected fashion, inflectional suffixes do not).
- Certain other consonants, depending on the dialect, also cause pharyngealization of adjacent sounds, although the effect is typically weaker than full emphasis spreading and usually has no effect on more distant vowels.
  - The velar fricative /x/ and the uvular consonant /q/ often cause partial backing of adjacent /a/ (and of /u/ and /i/ in Moroccan Arabic). For Moroccan Arabic, the effect is sometimes described as half as powerful as an emphatic consonant, as a vowel with uvular consonants on both sides is affected similarly to having an emphatic consonant on one side.
  - The pharyngeal consonants /ħ/ and /ʕ/ cause no emphasis spreading and may have little or no effect on adjacent vowels. In Egyptian Arabic, for example, /a/ adjacent to either sound is a fully front [æ]. In other dialects, /ʕ/ is more likely to have an effect than /ħ/.
  - In some Gulf Arabic dialects, /w/ and/or /l/ causes backing.
  - In some dialects, words such as الله /aɫɫaː/ Allāh has backed [ɑ]'s and in some dialects also velarized /l/.

==== Vowels ====
- Classical Arabic short vowels /a/, /i/ and /u/ undergo various changes.
  - Original final short vowels are mostly deleted.
  - Many Levantine Arabic dialects merge /i/ and /u/ into a phonemic /ə/ except when directly followed by a single consonant; this sound may appear allophonically as /i/ or /u/ in certain phonetic environments.
  - Maghreb dialects merge /a/ and /i/ into /ə/, which is deleted when unstressed. Tunisian maintains this distinction, but deletes these vowels in non-final open syllables.
  - Moroccan Arabic, under the strong influence of Berber, goes even further. Short /u/ is converted to labialization of an adjacent velar, or is merged with /ə/. This schwa then deletes everywhere except in certain words ending /-CCəC/.
    - The result is that there is no distinction between short and long vowels; borrowings from CA have "long" vowels (now pronounced half-long) uniformly substituted for original short and long vowels.
    - This also results in consonant clusters of great length, which are (more or less) syllabified according to a sonority hierarchy. For some subdialects, in practice, it is very difficult to tell where, if anywhere, there are syllabic peaks in long consonant clusters in a phrase such as /xsˤsˤk tktbi/ "you (fem.) must write". Other dialects, in the North, make a clear distinction; they say /xəssək təktəb/ "you want to write", and not */xəssk ətkətb/.
    - In Moroccan Arabic, short /a/ and /i/ have merged, obscuring the original distribution. In this dialect, the two varieties have completely split into separate phonemes, with one or the other used consistently across all words derived from a particular root except in a few situations.
      - In Moroccan Arabic, the allophonic effect of emphatic consonants is more pronounced than elsewhere.
      - Full /a/ is affected as above, but /i/ and /u/ are also affected, and are to [e] and [o], respectively.
      - In some varieties, such as in Marrakesh, the effects are even more extreme (and complex), where both high-mid and low-mid allophones exist ([e] and [ɛ], [o] and [ɔ]), in addition to front-rounded allophones of original /u/ ([y], [ø], [œ]), all depending on adjacent phonemes.
      - On the other hand, emphasis spreading in Moroccan Arabic is less pronounced than elsewhere; usually it only spreads to the nearest full vowel on either side, although with some additional complications.
  - /i~ɪ/ and /u~ʊ/ in CA completely become /e/ and /o/ respectively in some other particular dialects.
  - In Egyptian Arabic and Levantine Arabic, short /i/ and /u/ are elided in various circumstances in unstressed syllables (typically, in open syllables; for example, in Egyptian Arabic, this occurs only in the middle vowel of a VCVCV sequence, ignoring word boundaries). In Levantine, however, clusters of three consonants are almost never permitted. If such a cluster would occur, it is broken up through the insertion of /ə/ – between the second and third consonants in Egyptian Arabic, and between the first and second in Levantine Arabic.
- CA long vowels are shortened in some circumstances.
  - Original final long vowels are shortened in all dialects.
  - In Egyptian Arabic and Levantine Arabic, unstressed long vowels are shortened.
  - Egyptian Arabic also cannot tolerate long vowels followed by two consonants, and shortens them. (Such an occurrence was rare in CA, but often occurs in modern dialects as a result of elision of a short vowel.)
- In most dialects, particularly sedentary ones, CA /a/ and /aː/ have two strongly divergent allophones, depending on the phonetic context.
  - Adjacent to an emphatic consonant and to /q/ (but not usually to other sounds derived from this, such as /ɡ/ or /ʔ/), a back variant [ɑ] occurs; elsewhere, a strongly fronted variant [æ]~[ɛ] is used.
  - The two allophones are in the process of splitting phonemically in some dialects, as [ɑ] occurs in some words (particularly foreign borrowings) even in the absence of any emphatic consonants anywhere in the word. (Some linguists have postulated additional emphatic phonemes in an attempt to handle these circumstances; in the extreme case, this requires assuming that every phoneme occurs doubled, in emphatic and non-emphatic varieties. Some have attempted to make the vowel allophones autonomous and eliminate the emphatic consonants as phonemes. Others have asserted that emphasis is actually a property of syllables or whole words rather than of individual vowels or consonants. None of these proposals seems particularly tenable, however, given the variable and unpredictable nature of emphasis spreading.)
  - Unlike other Arabic varieties, Hejazi Arabic did not develop allophones of the vowels /a/ and /aː/, and both are pronounced as [a] or [ä].
- CA diphthongs /aj/ and /aw/ have become [eː] or [e̞ː] and [oː] or [o̞ː] (but merge with original /iː/ and /uː/ in Maghreb dialects, which is probably a secondary development). The diphthongs are maintained in the Maltese language and some urban Tunisian dialects, particularly that of Sfax, while [eː] and [oː] also occur in some other Tunisian dialects, such as Monastir.
- The placement of the stress accent is extremely variable between varieties; nowhere is it phonemic.
  - Most commonly, it falls on the last syllable containing a long vowel, or a short vowel followed by two consonants; but never farther from the end than the third-to-last syllable. This maintains the presumed stress pattern in CA (although there is some disagreement over whether stress could move farther back than the third-to-last syllable), and is also used in Modern Standard Arabic (MSA).
    - In CA and MSA, stress cannot occur on a final long vowel; however, this does not result in different stress patterns on any words, because CA final long vowels are shortened in all modern dialects, and any current final long vowels are secondary developments from words containing a long vowel followed by a consonant.
  - In Egyptian Arabic, the rule is similar, but stress falls on the second-to-last syllable in words of the form ...VCCVCV, as in /makˈtaba/.
  - In Maghrebi Arabic, stress is final in words of the (original) form CaCaC, after which the first /a/ is elided. Hence جَبَل ǧabal "mountain" becomes [ˈʒbəl].
  - In Moroccan Arabic, phonetic stress is often not recognizable.

== See also ==
- Arabic diglossia
- Arabic (disambiguation)
- International Association of Arabic Dialectology (AIDA)
- Teaching Arabic as a Foreign Language
