= Jebala people =

Tribal confederation living in Morocco

Coordinates: 34.7340°N 4.8100°W

Jebala
جبالة
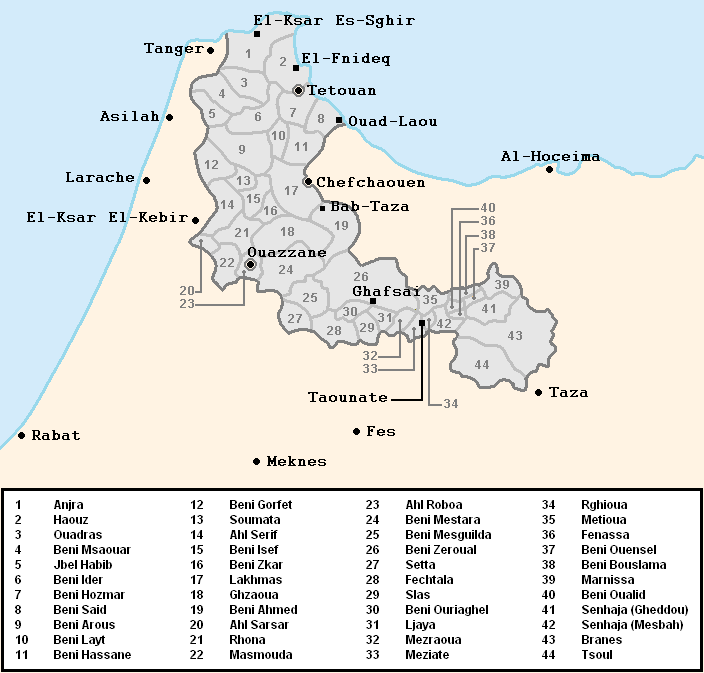
- Map of territories inhabited by Jebala with tribal composition in Northern Morocco

Total population
- 1,284,000

Regions with significant populations
- Northern Morocco, mostly concentrated in north-west Morocco and Rif

Languages
- Jebli Arabic

Religion
- Sunni Islam

The Jebala people (Arabic: جبالة, romanized: Jbāla) are a tribal confederation inhabiting an area in northwest Morocco from the town of Bab Berred to the west. The Jebala region thus occupies the western part of the Rif mountains. The Jebala has a population of 1,284,000 and is divided into over 40 tribes, today known as "rural communes" (جماعات قروية), and adjacent to them are a small group of nine tribes called the Ghmara (غمارة), who inhabit the territory between the line of mountain peaks to the north of Chefchaouen and the Mediterranean Sea. In addition to tribal heterogeneity, this region is also geographically diverse. High mountains are interspersed with hills and flatlands, and local inhabitants settle in both the high mountains and valleys. In addition to the rainy climate, which influences the way the inhabitants build their houses as well as their special agricultural practices, there are also numerous cultural characteristics that contribute to an emphasised sense of identity and make the Jbala people clearly distinguishable from their neighbours from the eastern part of the Rif Mountains (Riafa or Rwafa) where the climate is more arid, and from the former shepherds from the Atlantic coast (‘Arab). There are only a few cities in the country of the Jbala, and its population remains mostly rural. During the Middle Ages, chroniclers and historians knew the Jbala under their original name, Ghomara.

== Etymology ==
The word Jbala comes from Arabic جبل, Jbel, which means mountain. Thus, Jbala means "mountain people". The singular of Jbala is Jebli. A male is called a Jebli while a female is called a Jebliya. The word jebli literally means "from/of the mountain".

When the term Jebala first appeared is uncertain. The first time it is used in a written source is shortly after the rise of the Alawi dynasty. An author from the 18th century, 'Abd al-Karīm Al-Rīfī, reports the appointment in 1672 of ‘Umar B. Ḥaddū al-Temsamanī as qā’id nāḥiyat Jbāla wa al-Faḥṣ (lit. 'caid of the region of Jbāla and Faḥṣ'). Prior to being called Jebala, the inhabitants of the Jebala region were referred to as Ghomara.

In northwest Morocco, the word jebli is used to refer to someone living in the countryside or a peasant whereas in the Atlantic plains which is inhabited by the ʿArubis, jebli is used to describe anybody from the Jebala whether they inhabit the city or the country.

== Origins ==
The Jebala are of mixed origin. The Jebala, themselves, trace their ethnic and cultural origin to Al-Andalus. They adopted the Arabic language between the 10th and 15th centuries, influenced by Arab townspeople of northern Morocco and Al-Andalus and the fact that their land lies on the route between these places.

Cities like Tétouan and Chefchaouen are inhabited by populations partially descending from Al-Andalus, either from Andalusian Arabs or Spanish Jews. (Note: "Due to its particular history, the medina of Chefchaouen was originally populated predominantly by Andalusian Arabs and Spanish Jews, and later by Berbers from the surrounding rural areas.") In the case of Chefchaouen, these populations were the original inhabitants with nearby Berbers later migrating into the city.

== History ==
Very little is known about the prehistory of the region, but the history of the Jebala people seems to be well documented since early Islamic times. The early Islamic history of the Rif, through the Emirate of Nekor established by Salih ibn Mansur of the Nefzaoua Berbers and which lasted from pre-Idrisid until Almoravid times with the fall of the Madinat al-Nakur (710–1108 CE). This part of the history seems to be well documented, but when the Berber dynasty of Almoravids started ruling, the history of the Rif was almost unknown. The usual tradition is that almost every existing social group in the Rif mountains originated from somewhere else, not too far away from the country.

== Culture ==
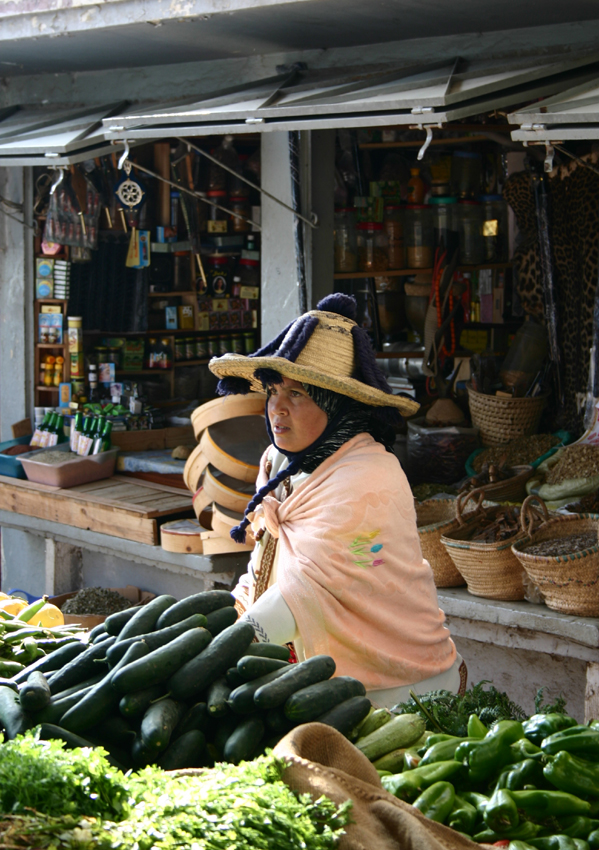
A Jebala woman at a marketplace

=== Language ===
The Jbala people primarily speak Moroccan Arabic with lesser or greater degrees of Berber. There is also a significant amount of influence from French and Spanish whilst incorporating foreign languages from radio stations.

The variety of Arabic spoken by the Jbala is known as Jebli Arabic which falls under the sub-dialect grouping of Shamali Arabic. Shamali Arabic including Jebli Arabic belongs to the Pre-Hilalian or Non-Hilali group of Maghrebi Arabic - a term that introduced by French Orientalists William Marçais and Georges Séraphin Colin, who argued that the first arabicization of Northern Africa took place long before the migration of the Bani Hilal tribe in the 12th-13th centuries. The pre-Hilali group consists of the Jebli dialect together with the dialects spoken in other North African cities. The Jbala, together with several groups of population inhabiting the Algerian and Tunisian part of the Tell Atlas, were the first Imazighen (Berbers) who arabicised their language, probably due to their proximity to the old route that once connected Fes (as well as Tlemcen and Constantine) with Mediterranean ports, especially with those located in al-Andalus. As the most archaic group of Arabic dialects in the region, the Pre-Hilali dialects are characterised by a strong influence from Berber on all levels—phonetic, morphological, and lexical. There are differences between the Jebli dialect spoken by the northern Jbala and southern Jbala.

=== Clothing ===
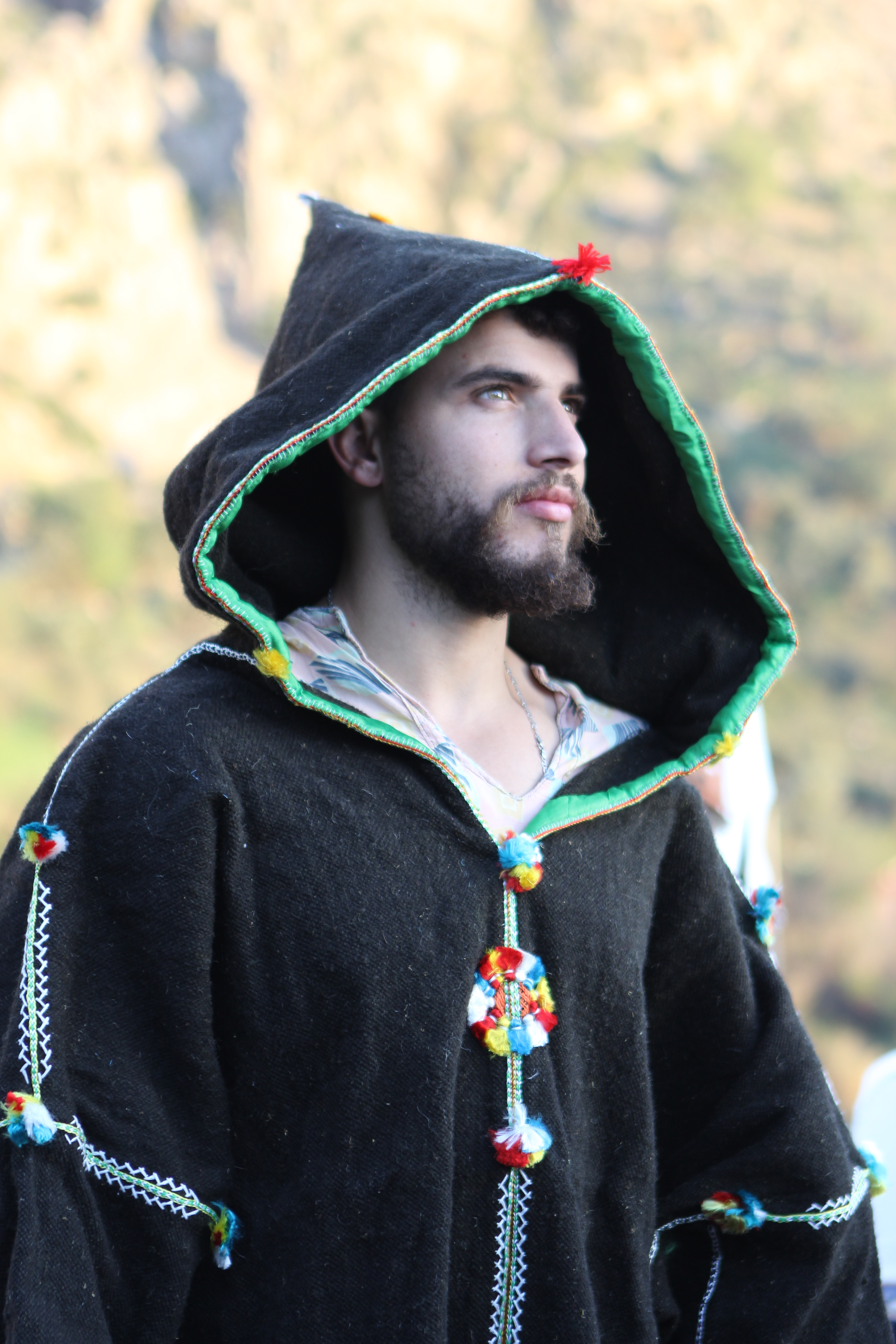
Jebli man in a djellaba

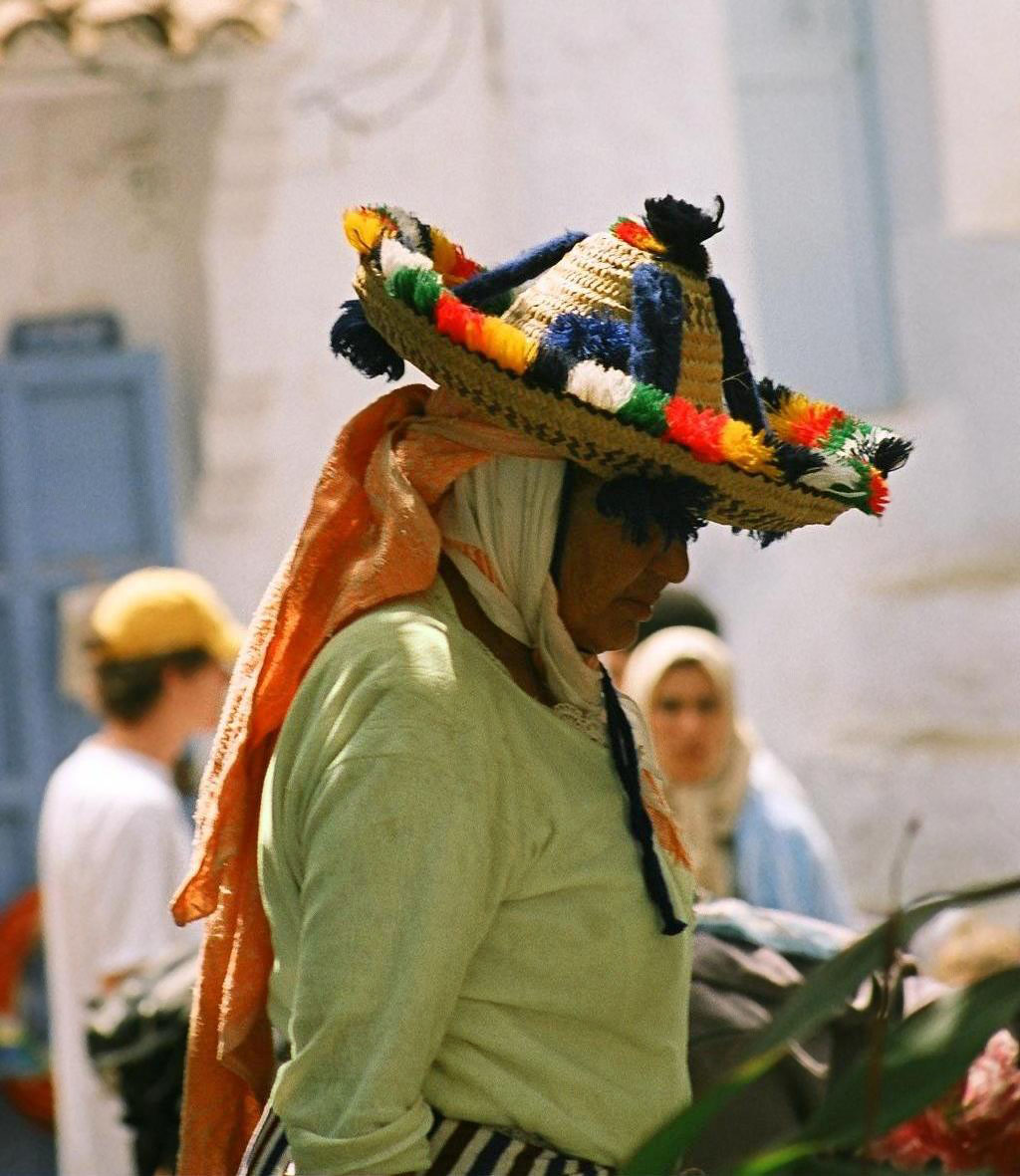
Jebli woman in a sheshiya

Reed hats, known as sheshiyas, are a traditional feature of Jebala dress for both genders. They're often decorated with multi-coloured yarn pompoms. Women's hats are often adorned with woven woollen tassels and roping in black, white and red variations.

Jebala women wear shawls called mendils made from cotton or wool. These rectangular shawls are often woven in stripes of white and red in the region. They are wrapped around the waist to form skirts. They are also for holding babies or goods on the back or front of the body.

The traditional man's outer garment is the djellaba, a one-piece cotton or woolen cloak with a pointed hood. In the Jebala region, the wool is usually undyed so dark brown and off-white colours are common. White djellabas are worn for religious festivals. Historically, the djellaba of the Jebala had embroidery and multi-coloured pompoms but it has recently conformed to the style that has become common in Morocco losing those features and becoming longer. The qashshab, a long, straight blouse of thick white wool, without sleeves or a hood, is still worn.

The Jebala favour the babouches, pointed-toed leather slippers. Natural light brown, yellow and white are the most common colours.

=== Oral tradition ===
Today, the oral poetic tradition of the Jbala is known among outsiders under the generic term ayta jabaliya. At the national level, it became famous across Morocco largely thanks to the efforts of a talented poet, musician and singer of Jebli origin (Bni Zerwal بني زروال), Mohamed Laroussi, (محمد لعروسي) (1933–2014), who received from his countrywide audiences the honorary titles of the fannān Jbāla’ (فنان جبالة), or ‘the artist of the Jbala’, or ‘maḥbūb Jbāla’ (محبوب جبالة), or ‘beloved by all Jbala people’. For decades his songs have been available for purchase not only in northern Morocco, where Laaroussi's name is widely known, but throughout the country, first on LPs, then tapes, and recently on CDs and in MP3 format. Laaroussi's concerts have been regularly shown on Moroccan television since the 1960s. Today both his audio and video records can be easily found on YouTube and other internet video hosting sites.

Although pretty much everything produced in the Jbala region is referred to as ayta jabaliya, there are in fact three different genres: ʿayta jebliya’ (عيطة جبلية), ʿayyuʿ (عيوع) and ughniya’ (اغنية). Interestingly, and despite their heterogeneity, the Jbala trace their ethnic and cultural origin to the times of Moorish Andalusian Spain (711–1492). Any Jbala musician and singer, who is often also a ‘poet’ and even an ‘artist’ (because Jebli poetry does not exist without music and performance and a local poet almost always sings his own songs, accompanying himself with a musical instrument) will usually tell an outsider the legend of Tariq ibn Ziyad, the famous conqueror of Spain, his trip through the Straits of Gibraltar (Jabal Tariq, the Mountain of Tariq, hence "Gibraltar"), and the sad end of Islamic rule in Spain. The sense of cultural continuity between the Jbala region and Andalusia is very strong even today.

=== Poetry ===
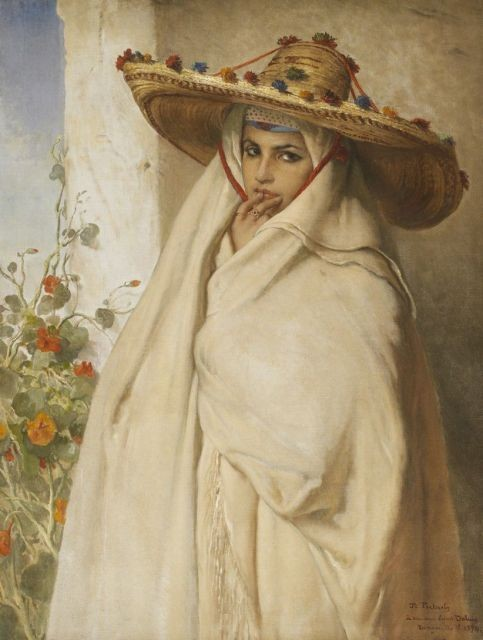
"Aouicha" by Jean-François Portaels depicting a woman from Tangier in Jebli clothing

The traditional Jebli poetry has the following general characteristics: it is practically always oral and almost always unauthored: in the traditional Jebli culture it is very unusual to hear that someone claims authorship of a particular song/poem. Poetry is often improvised but sometimes can also be memorised and then performed. Remarkably, Jebli poetry is always linked to music and performance and, perhaps because of this, is never referred to as ‘poetry’ or shi’r (شعر) or zajal (زجل). Instead, it is routinely called klam (كلام), which can be roughly compared to the meaning of English ‘lyrics’. At the same time, music or lhan (لحن), is highly valued and it is always music that identifies the genre.

A traditional Jebli poet links his/her verses to a particular melody, from the set of possible melodies typical of this tradition. Once the melody is chosen, he/she then tries to organise his/her poetry into beyt-s (بيت), or quatrains. It is not clear how well the poet understands the concept of Arabic beyt and links to it concept of qafiya (قافية), or rhyme. It is very possible that local poets use this terminology in a rather superficial way: after all, their poems only exist during the moment when they are being performed. In other words, a Jebli poem is difficult to visualise on paper and can be compared to a rather distant tradition of Classical Arabic poetry that was once born n the Arabian Peninsula. However, a Jebli beyt does have particular characteristics that the poet has in mind and tries to conform with: beyt is typically but not necessarily made of four hemistichs, where each one is made of 6-8 syllables, and the second hemistich is rhymed with the fourth one. If the beyt becomes a part of ayta jebliya or ughniya, the poet will also produce a lazima (لازمة), or refrain, that will cement the text together. This poetry has recently been analyzed within the framework of cognitive poetics, showing how spontaneous oral performance is aided by recourse to cognitive frames, scripts and formulaic language.

=== Music ===
Music and dancing are also very important in Jbala culture. The Jebala play the "Ghayta" (a form of clarinet), and the tbul (drum), and dancing is generally performed by boys. The Rif musicians, who belong to a socially and occupational inferior class calling themselves "Imdhyazen", generally come from one tribe, the "Ait Touzin". They play the "Addjun" (tambourine) and the "zammar" (a kind of clarinet) with unmarried girls and old women dancing.

== Economic and cultural differences ==
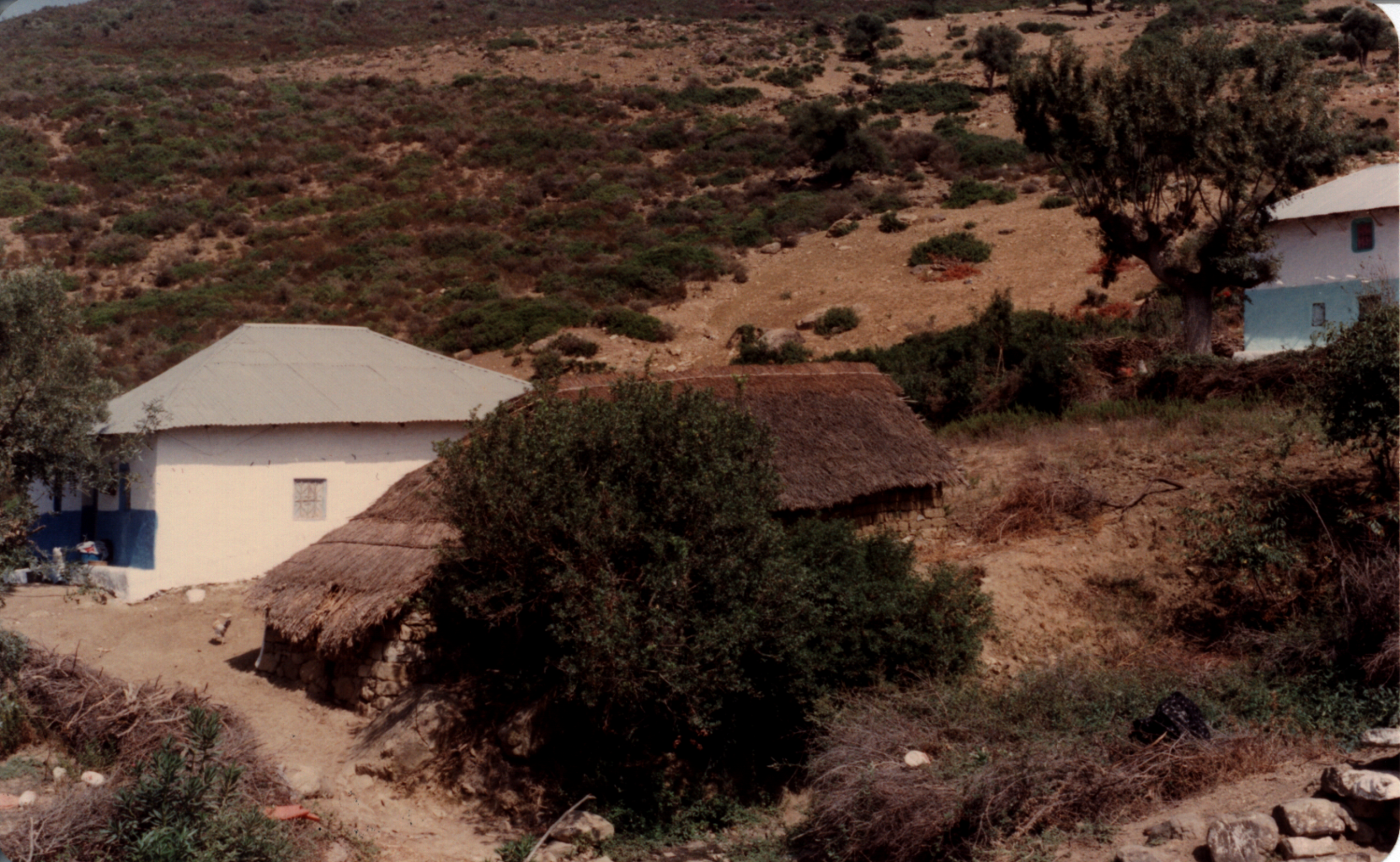
Jebala house with thatched roof

The Jebala people have a different culture compared to the Rifians. The Jebala people use oxen yoked by their horns for ploughing, opposed to the Rifians' use of cows yoked by their neck. For the roofing of their houses, the Jebala people make roofs made of corrugated iron or thatch, when the Rifians use dried clay. The Jebala who inhabit the Atlantic coast, Tangier area and the Senhaja of Srair people in Ketama, Morocco region have more rainfall, and therefore prefer pointed roof, in the Rif, where there is less rainfall flat roof is used. The Jebala have villages with houses clustered together, while the Rifians traditionally have dispersed homesteads, located at least 300 metres from each other.

=== Special technologies ===
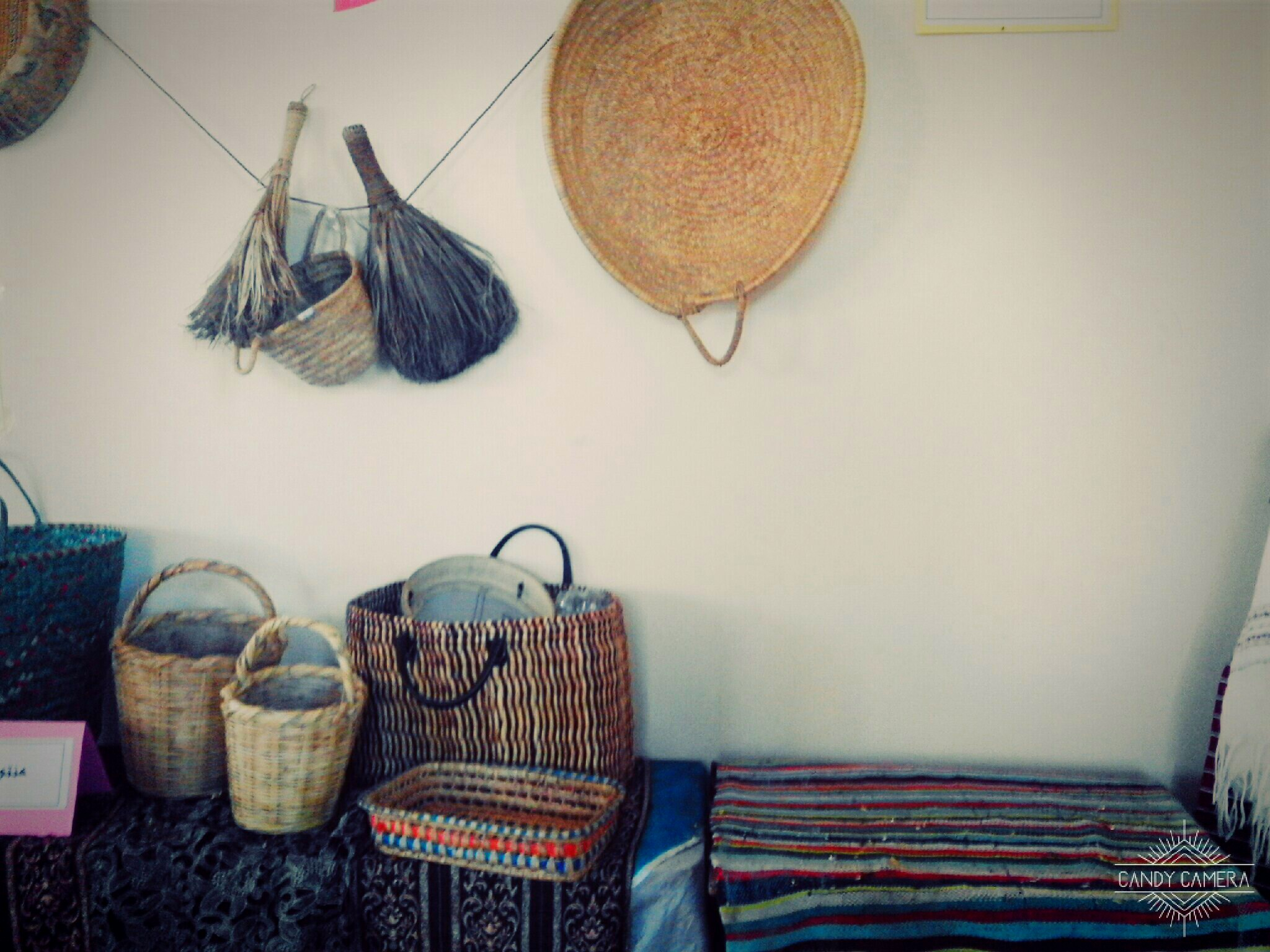
Different materials which residents of Jbala use to do their daily tasks

The Rif is not just a mountainous area. Its proximity to the straits of Gibraltar gave this area an important role: the western part of the Rif is a transit route, leading to the Mediterranean world, in particular, to al-Andalus. This has had a certain impact on its inhabitants: early arabisation, a high density of literate people, the cultural and economic influence of neighbouring cities, etc. In addition, these factors led to the emergence of technical innovations that are modest, yet surprising in the Maghreb context: sloping thatched-roofs (الدار د سقف), identical to those found in the south of Andalusia; the yoking of horned cattle, where the yoke is placed at the base of the skull, just behind the horns (برواسي) to which it is fixed, a system which is known only in some limited areas in Europe; the haystack (التمون) made without a cob bedding, instead held together by a set of cords fixed with stones; the granary raised on pillars (لهري), which exists in some other parts of the world, the closest place being in the Spanish Cantabrian Mountains; the hand flour mill with connecting rod-crank (رحي د ليد), where an alternating movement transforms into a rotary movement, according to the mechanical principle of the connecting rod-crank; the water mill with vertical shed (رحي د الما), the use of which is limited to a small area on the straits of Gibraltar, unlike the ramp mill which is in use in the rest of the country; the oil press with double lateral screws (معيصرة), mobile because of its small size; and the piston-type butter-churn (مخاط), with vertical movement instead of lateral.

Moreover, it is shielded by the sea and, at the same time, protected from southern influences by the barrier of the great ridge. This isolation had a double effect, added to four centuries of no contact between Morocco and the Iberian Peninsula. But perhaps we should consider this entire region of northwest Morocco to be a privileged area in terms of confluences, since it combines a great diversity of natural factors with its proximity to the sea and presence on terrestrial routes.

=== Biodiversity and agriculture ===
The Rif is one of the most populated mountain ranges in the Mediterranean basin. The western and central parts of this area are considered as a “hot spot” of Mediterranean biodiversity: we can speak of a true refuge of agrodiversity, where rare crops of cereals and legumes that are considered at a national level to be minor or marginal have been preserved, such as rye, or chentil (آشنتيل), small spelt or einkorn, chqalia (شقالية), and sorghum, or dra (درة), is the main spring cereal instead of the usual corn. As well as the impressive diversity of fruit trees. There are over a hundred varieties of fig trees. In addition, vine production has long been known in this region, evidence of which has been documented by many travellers. Today, grape syrup, known as samit (صامت), is still produced locally; often it is lightly fermented and then contains alcohol, which causes controversy about the legitimacy of its use (in the context of Islamic beliefs). The olive tree is essential and occupies 77% of the land used for tree planting. This area is also known for production of original honeys, particularly the carob and arbutus types. Wild plants are widely utilised because of their nutritional value. On the other hand, the flax and mulberry trees have disappeared and, with them, have disappeared a significant number of local crafts.

At the level of agronomic practices, the local population has been successfully bringing innovation into local products. These products are of special value, given the current interest and strong demand for organic produce, as well as produce with important dietary properties, based on ancient traditions and local varieties. However, the transmission of this know-how to the new generation is proving difficult.

== Religious traditions and pilgrimages ==
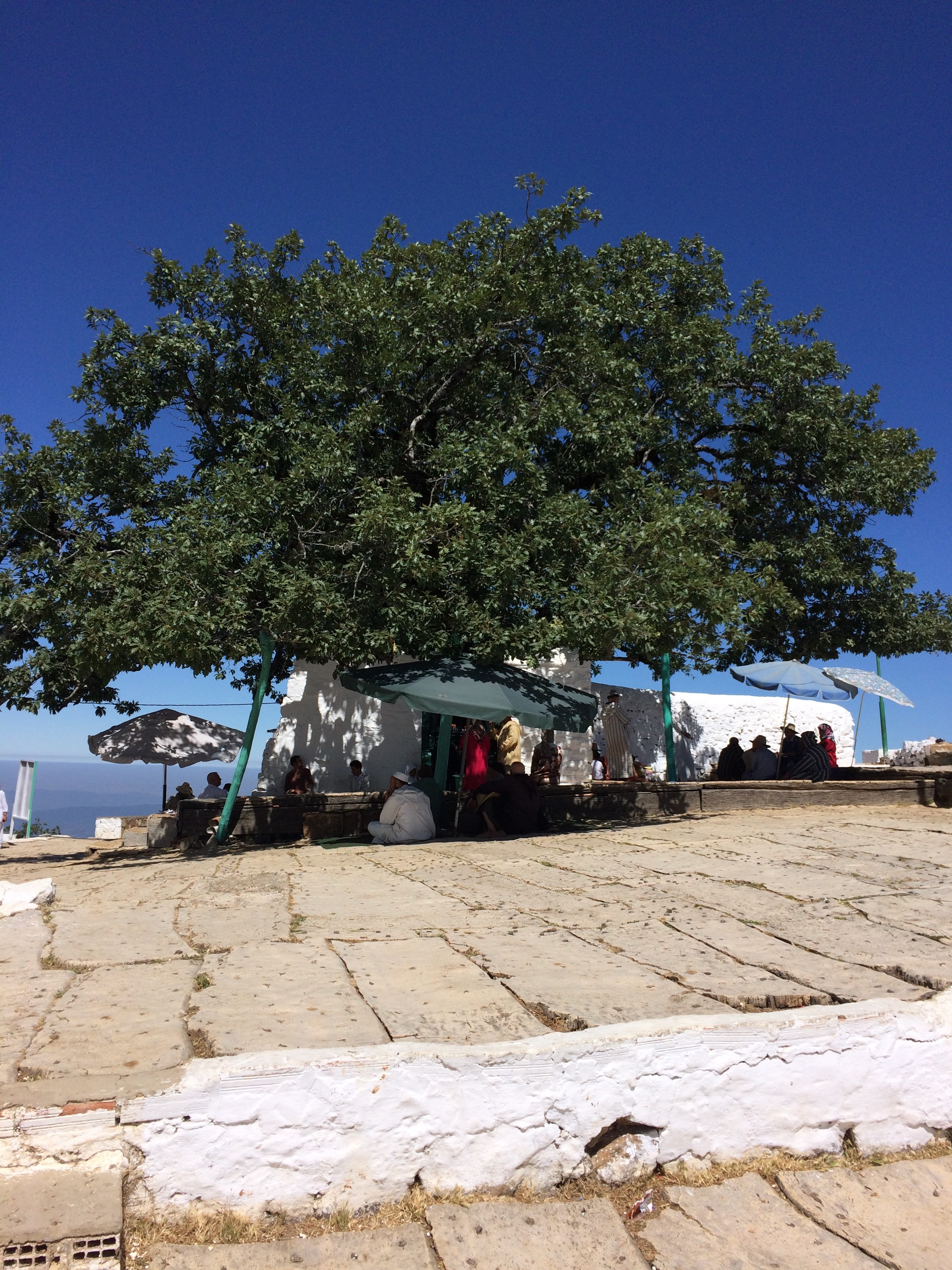
Shrine of Moulay Abdessalam, Bni Arouss, 2018

The Jbala people are Muslims, but their religious practices are characterized by many specific local traditions. In particular, they practice what is known in the Muslim tradition as the minor or local pilgrimage, or ‘ziyara’ (زيارة). Such pilgrimages are usually made to shrines of local saints all over the Muslim world. The Jbala region, however, has the reputation of being the land of saints, due to high density of sacred places scattered all over the area. Each of the Jebli tribes has at least one Sufi lodge, or ‘zawiya’ (زاوية), adjacent to its shrine, or ‘darih’ (ضريح). Almost all zawiya-s have their season or ‘mawsem’ (موسم), or grand gatherings of faithful Muslims that happen on fixed dates during a particular time frame. For instance, the tribe of Bni Zerwal alone, which inhabits the southeast area of the Jbala, is said to have seven such locations. Some saints, such as Moulay Bou Shta el-Khammar (مولاي بوشتا الخمار) and Sidi Allal el-Hajj (سيدي علال الحاج), seem to be more reputable than others.

However, there is one particular saint who is highly honoured not only by members of Jebli society but also across the Moroccan kingdom. This is Moulay Abdessalam Ben Mashish (مولاي عبد السلام بن مشيش), a native of the Jbala region. Moulay Abdessalam is the quṭb al-Maġrib al-aqṣa (قطب المغرب الاقصى)—‘the spiritual pole of the far Maghreb’. It is important to mention that the term qutb has a special meaning in the Islamic tradition, referring to a spiritual symbol of particular time. It is also of importance that throughout their history Sufi orders in the Kingdom of Morocco developed and evolved around only two quṭbs—Moulay Abdessalam ben Mshish, a native of the Jbala who is viewed as the ‘western pole’, and Moulay Abdelqader Jilali, a native of Iraq who is regarded as the ‘eastern pole'. In Morocco this term has acquired an extra nuance: quṭbs are considered to be those who play the role of spiritual leaders for other saints.

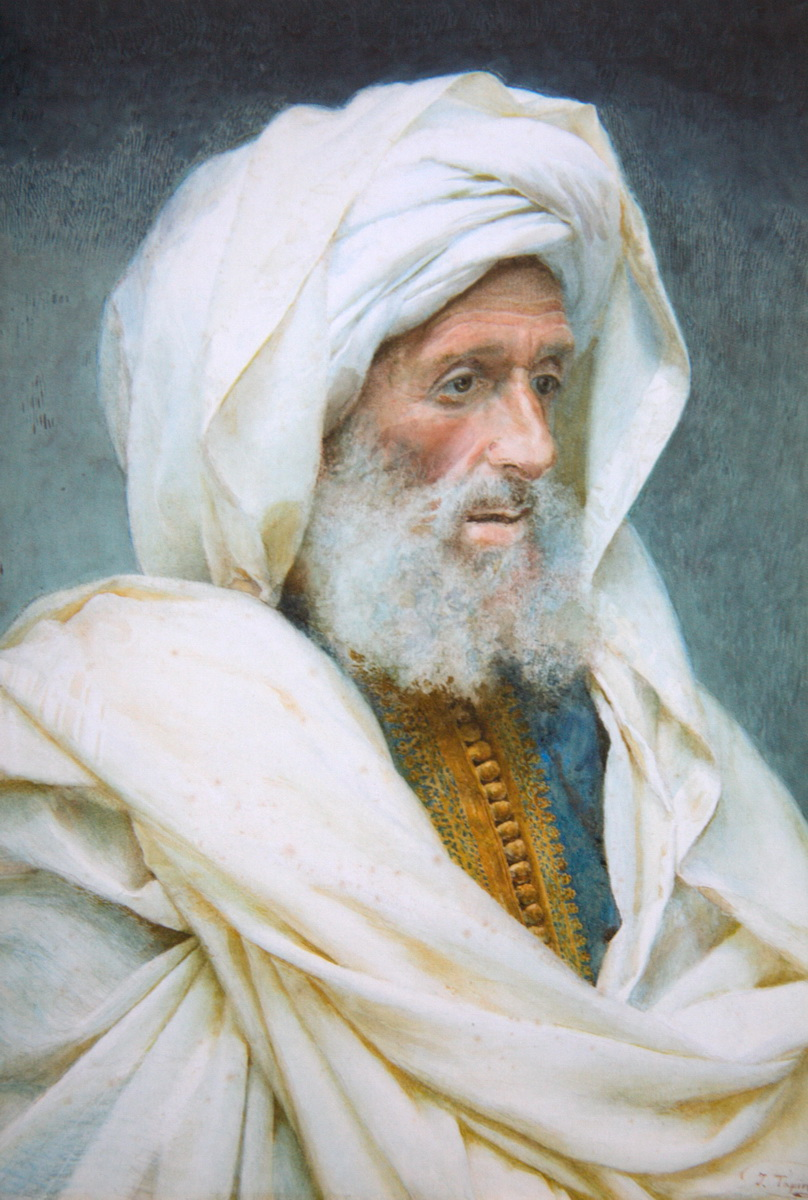
"Sharif of Ouazzane" by Josep Tapiró i Baró; between (1876 and 1913)

This idea is closely linked to the brotherhood of Shadhiliya, one of the most powerful Sufi orders not only in Morocco but throughout North Africa. The tradition of going on pilgrimage to the shrine of Moulay Abdessalam ben Mshish has played an exceptionally important role in Jebli society over many centuries. Traditionally, the beginning of the pilgrimage season to Moulay Abdessalam is calculated based on the Islamic calendar and takes place around the 15th of Shaaban. At this time not only do Jebli pilgrims come from all corners of the land of the Jbala but also pilgrims from other parts of Morocco. They flock to Mount Alam (جبلالعلم).The gathering of pilgrims, also known as lamma (لامة), is accompanied by the chanting of religious hymns and prayers, and then smoothly transforms into picnics and get-togethers of family and friends during which it is common to exchange short sung poems, or ayyu-s (عيوع).

== List of Jebala tribes ==
The Jebala consist of 48 tribes:

1. Anjra
2. Haouz
3. Beni Ouadras
4. Beni Msaouar
5. Jbel Habib
6. Beni Ider
7. Beni Hozmar
8. Beni Said
9. Beni Arous
10. Beni Layt
11. Beni Hassane
12. Beni Gorfet
13. Soumata
14. Ahl Serif
15. Beni Isef
16. Beni Zkar
17. Lakhmas
18. Ghzaoua
19. Beni Ahmed
20. Ahl Sarsar
21. Rhona
22. Masmouda
23. Ahl Roboa
24. Beni Mestara
25. Beni Mesguilda
26. Beni Zeroual
27. Setta
28. Fechtala
29. Slas
30. Beni Ouriaghel
31. Ljaya
32. Mezraoua
33. Meziate
34. Rghioua
35. Fenassa
36. Beni Ouensel
37. Beni Bouslama
38. Marnissa
39. Beni Oualid
40. Senhaja-Gheddou
41. Senhaja-Mesbah
42. Branes
43. Tsoul
44. Bni Rzine

== See also ==
- Tanger
- Tetouan
- Fes
- Mountain people

== Sources ==
- Vignet-Zunz, Jacques Jawhar (2014). Les Jbala du Rif: des lettrés en montagne. Casablanca [Aix-en-Provence]: Éditions la Croisée des chemins IREMAM. pp. 201–203. ISBN 978-9954-1-0484-2.
- Dipasquale, Letizia (2020-12-14). Understanding Chefchaouen: Traditional knowledge for a sustainable habitat. Firenze University Press. ISBN 978-88-5518-177-8.
- Gintsburg, Sarali Yurievna (2014). Formulaicity in Jbala Poetry. Tilburg University. ISBN 978-94-6167-180-6.
- Fernández, Montserrat Benítez; Guerrero, Jairo (2022-11-01). "The Jebli speech between the media and the city: exploring linguistic stereotypes on a rural accent in Northern Morocco". International Journal of the Sociology of Language (278): 181–202. doi:10.1515/ijsl-2022-0015. hdl:10261/288467. ISSN 1613-3668.
- Curtis, Maria (2015-10-15). ""I Have a Voice": Despatialization, Multiple Alterities and the Digital Performance of Jbala Women of Northern Morocco". Hawwa. 13 (3): 323–343. doi:10.1163/15692086-12341285. ISSN 1569-2078.
