= Ceuta Arabic =

Dialect of Moroccan Arabic spoken in Ceuta, Spain

- Arabic of Ceuta
- العربية السبتية
- Native to: Spain
- Region: Ceuta
- Ethnicity: Arabs
- Native speakers: 40%–42% of speakers are bilingual in Arabic and Spanish in Ceuta
- Language family: Afro-Asiatic: Semitic; West; Central; Arabic; Maghrebi; Moroccan; Jebli or other pre-Hilalian dialects (?); Ceuta Arabic
- Writing system: Arabic and Latin

Language codes
- ISO 639-3: –
- Glottolog: None

Ceuta Arabic (Spanish: árabe ceutí), also known as Arabic of Ceuta or simply Darija (Spanish: dariya), is a dialect of Moroccan Arabic spoken in the Spanish autonomous city of Ceuta, which borders Morocco in North Africa. It is spoken by roughly 40% of Ceuta's population, including by nearly two-thirds of Muslim Arabs.

Linguistically, it shares characteristics with Jebala and other northern dialects of Moroccan Arabic, including many Spanish loanwords. Code-switching with Spanish is also common among its speakers. It has been present in Ceuta since the mid-18th century, but like Moroccan Arabic, it does not have a codified writing standard. Its absence in the administrative and educational registers in Spain gives it a "marginalized" status. Therefore, it is likely that the number of Arabic speakers in Ceuta as their first language is decreasing, due to a perceived less "prestigious" status than the Spanish language.

== Recognition efforts ==
In 2021, Muslim Arabs in Ceuta called on the Spanish government to grant legal recognition to Ceuta Arabic. This initiative was initiated and supported by the local party, the Caballas Coalition, led by Mohamed Alí. The request was also supported by Coalició Compromís, a Valencian political party. A previous demand had been made in 2018 but it was met with opposition from the People's Party and the Spanish Socialist Workers' Party, which rejected its recognition as an official regional language by the Spanish government. A report by the Rajoy government to the Council of Europe in accordance with the European Charter for Regional or Minority Languages described Ceuta Arabic as a language influenced by emigration to Spain and therefore not meeting the criteria for the charter.

== See also ==
- Moroccan Arabic
