= Fessi Arabic =

Dialect of Moroccan vernacular Arabic

- Fessi Darija
- Native to: Morocco
- Language family: Afro-Asiatic: Semitic; West Semitic; Central Semitic; North Arabian?; Arabic; Maghrebi; Pre-Hilalian; Urban; Fessi Arabic
- Writing system: Arabic alphabet

Language codes
- ISO 639-3: –
- Glottolog: fezm1238

The Fessi Arabic (Moroccan Arabic: هضرة أهل فاس) is a dialect of Moroccan vernacular Arabic, or Darija, associated with the city of Fes, especially with the old elite families of the city.

It is considered pre-Hilalian and some of its distinguishing phonological features are the pronunciation of rāʾ ( ر ) as a postalveolar approximant (like the American pronunciation of /ɹ/ in the word "red") instead of a trilled [r] and of qāf ( ق or, traditionally, ڧ ) as a pharyngealized glottal stop or voiceless uvular plosive instead of a voiced velar plosive ([g]).

The Fessi dialect has traditionally been regarded as a prestige dialect over other forms of Moroccan Darija, as a function of the historic social and economic power of its speakers.

== History ==
Like other urban Moroccan dialects, it is considered pre-Hilalian. 'Pre-Hilalian' in this context refers to dialects believed to descend from the Arabic spoken in the region prior to the arrival of the Banu Hilal and the Banu Ma'qil tribes that began in the 12th century. After this event, "Hilalian" dialects became dominant in the rural regions of central Morocco and are a major component of wider Moroccan Arabic today.

Due to social and demographic changes that started in the 20th century such as mass rural migration into the city and the departure of most of the city's old urban elites to Casablanca, the traditional linguistic features are no longer dominant in the speech of Arabic speakers in Fes today.

=== Jewish Fessi dialect ===
The Jewish community in Fes, prior to the departure of most of the city's Jewish residents in the second half of the 20th century, also spoke an Arabic dialect similar to the rest of city. (Note: There are competing theories about the historical roots of Moroccan Jewish dialects of Arabic. Some scholars argue that they were strongly influenced by Andalusi Arabic dialects (which were similar to North African dialects) brought by Jewish refugees from Spain after 1492, while other scholars argue that these same refugees mostly spoke Judeo-Spanish when they arrived and eventually adopted existing Arabic dialects in the cities.)

== Linguistic features ==
=== Phonology ===
It has traditionally had distinctive linguistic features, many of which were shared with other pre-Hilalian dialects in the region: on the phonological level, these include the stereotypical use of a postalveolar approximant (like the American pronunciation of /ɹ/ in the word "red") in the place of a trilled [r] for /ر/, or a pharyngealized glottal stop or voiceless uvular plosive in the place of a voiced velar plosive ([g]) for /ق/.

=== Morphosyntax ===
On the morphosyntactic level, gender distinction in pronouns and verb inflections is neutralized in the second person singular.

=== Sociolinguistic features ===
The Fessi dialect has traditionally been regarded as a prestige dialect over other forms of Moroccan Darija—particularly those seen as rural or 'arūbi (عروبي "of the rural Arabs")—due to its "association with the socio-economic power and dominance that its speakers enjoy at the national level," in the words of Mohammed Errihani.
