= Jijel Arabic =

Pre-Hilalian Arabic dialect of northeastern Algeria

Jijeli
- Native to: Algeria
- Region: Jijel Province
- Language family: Afro-Asiatic: Semitic; Central Semitic; Arabic; Maghrebi Arabic; Jijeli

Language codes
- ISO 639-3: None (mis)
- Linguist List: arq-jij
- Glottolog: None
- IETF: ar-u-sd-dz18

Jijeli, or Jijel Arabic, is a variety of Arabic spoken specifically in the Jijel Province in northeastern Algeria, but traces of it reach parts of the neighboring Skikda and Mila Provinces. It is quite different from all the other Arabic dialects spoken in eastern Algeria and has probably survived into present times because of the geographic enclavement of that mountainous area and the difficulty of terrestrial connections with the rest of the country for centuries.

Jijel is a relic of the Pre-Hilalian Arabic dialects (resulting from the Muslim conquest of the Maghreb in the 7th and 8th centuries) once spoken over all of Constantine, Algeria but later mixed with Bedouin Hilalian dialects brought by the invasion of the Banu Hilal in the 11th century.

Pre-Hilalian Arabic dialects remained intact only in a small area around Jijel while they were heavily mixed with bedouin dialects in the areas of Constantine, Mila, Collo and El Milia. Pre-Hilalian dialects also remain in the urban areas of Fez, Rabat, Tlemcen, Constantine and Tunis. Tlemcen Arabic and Jijel Arabic remain very close.

It belongs to the so-called “mountain” pre-Hilalian dialects, meaning dialects that emerged from the first wave of Arabization that began in the 8th century. It is very close to the Bougiote Arabic dialect, although the latter has significantly declined in recent years in favor of Kabyle. It is also very similar to the old Constantine Arabic dialect, which has likewise declined, but in favor of Hilalian Arabic of the High Plateaus (Hilalian dialects dating from the 11th and 12th centuries).

The Djidjelian dialect is one of the Arabic dialects most strongly marked by a Berber substrate. This dialect is spoken by the Kabyle Hadra, a mountain people of Berber Kutama origin from Small Kabylia who are Arabic-speaking.

== Characteristics ==
It is distinguished by a sharp pronunciation of the letters “qaf” and “kaf”, as well as by the elimination of many emphatic Arabic consonants such as “dh” and “th”, and by the use of the particles “ḥa” (a, an), “di” (of), “d” (is, are), and “ka” (a modal particle placed before verbs in the present tense).

== History and origins ==
Following the first Arab-Muslim conquest of North Africa in the 8th century, four urban centers emerged: Kairouan, Constantine, Tlemcen, and Fes. Each of these centers was connected to two Mediterranean ports (Collo and Jijel in the case of Constantine). It was within these four triangles (an inland city / port / port) that the first Maghrebi Arabic varieties developed. These dialects are today referred to as pre-Hilalian, since they date from before the invasions of the Banu Hilal in the 11th century. They share several common features, including the confusion of gender in the second person singular (nta, nti, or ntina used for both genders), the replacement of Arabic interdental consonants (pronounced with the tongue between the teeth, such as “th” and “dh”) with lighter consonants, the transformation of “t” into “ts” or “tch,” and the use of modal particles before present-tense verbs (ka, ku, ki, tsa, etc.) in order to distinguish the present from the future (since both tenses share the same conjugation in Arabic).

The eastern elites—Arab and Persian military aristocracies of the Umayyad Caliphate and later the Aghlabid dynasty who arrived in the 8th century—were urban populations. They settled in Constantine, Collo, and Jijel, where they spread the Arabic language—then the official and sacred language—among the old urban populations and Latin-speaking inhabitants of these cities. Over the centuries, this urban Arabic gradually spread among the surrounding Amazigh rural populations, where it incorporated Amazigh vocabulary and phonetic features.

The pre-Hilalian dialects of the provinces of Jijel Province and Tlemcen Province, as well as those of northern Morocco (including the Jebli dialect), still exist today and remain similar to one another. In contrast, those of Kairouan and Constantine have now almost completely disappeared, having been replaced by predominantly Hilalian dialects—varieties now spoken across most of Algeria, Tunisia, Libya, Western Sahara, and Mauritania. Moroccan dialects, however, retain a stronger pre-Hilalian component than those of the other Maghrebi countries.

== Pronunciation ==
The Jijelian dialect has its own distinctive phonetics (accent), which unfortunately cannot be fully conveyed in writing. It also features modified pronunciations of certain consonants of Algerian Arabic. The main examples are as follows:

The dhal (ﺫ) is pronounced dal (ﺩ); for example: dib (“wolf”).

The dhad (ﺽ) is pronounced ṭa (ﻃ); for example: m’rét (“sick”).

The tha (ﺙ) is pronounced tsa (ﺗﺲ); for example: tsum (“garlic”).

The ta (ﺕ) is also pronounced tsa (ﺗﺲ); for example: tsmér (“dates”).

The ẓa (ﻈ) is pronounced ṭa (ﻃ); for example: en’watér (“glasses”).

The v sound from French loanwords becomes b; for example: serbita (“serviette”, towel/napkin).

The qaf (ﻕ) is pronounced kaf (ﻙ), like the Latin c; for example: ecca’hwa (“coffee”).

The kaf (ﻙ) is slightly aspirated (unlike its pronunciation in other regions) and in some places—especially among rural speakers—it may be pronounced tcha; for example, kersi (“chair”) becomes tchersi.

There are also phonological changes involving the consonant l:

L is eliminated when it precedes b, and the b becomes geminated (strengthened). For example: “dog” is pronounced kebb instead of kelb, “heart” becomes qebb, “the door” becomes ebbab instead of el bab, “the sea” becomes ebbhar, etc. L is also eliminated when it precedes m, and the m is geminated. For example: “water” becomes em’ma instead of el ma’, “death” becomes em’mout, “the woman” becomes em’mra, etc. Finally, L is also eliminated when it precedes q, and the q is doubled, as in the previous cases. For example: “the bottle” becomes eqqerʿa instead of el qerʿa, “the heart” becomes eqqebb, etc.

Regarding vowels, some are frequently modified. For instance, the sound “ou” is altered in many words. Examples include: “bread” pronounced "kheubz" instead of "khoubz", “dwelling” pronounced "seukna" instead of "soukna".

Additionally, the possessive endings -koum and -houm are always pronounced -kem and -hem. For example: “their house” is said eddar diylhem instead of "eddar diyahoum", “your country” is said "bladkem", “where are you?” is said "fayenkem?"

== Interrogative words ==
Most of the interrogative words used in the Jijelian dialect are specific to this variety; they are not found in this form in the surrounding dialects. Here is the complete list:

interrogative word	Translation	Example	Translation
Diyech?	what?	Diyech? dchdi ku tdouḥ?	what? what are you looking for?
Dechdi?	what is?	Dechdi kayen?	what is there ?
Dichoua? / Tchoua?	what is this?	Dichoua hada ? / Tchoua hada ?	what's this
Kifech? / kich?	how ?	Kich ruḥt latem ?	how did you go there?
Dama?	which	Kunt fi dama blad?	in which country where you ?
Dama howwa? / dama héya?	which one?	Dama hiya eddar dialek?	which one is your house?
Qeddech?	how much/how many?	Qeddech ku tsayelli?	how much do I owe you?
Fayweq?	when?	fayweq wellit?	when did you retain ?
Ɛliyyech? / Liyyech? / Lech ?	why?	Ɛliyyech ku tdir haked ?	why are you doing like that ?
Menho ? D'emmen ? Lemmen	who? for whom ?	Menhou eddi ja? , Lemmen téléphonet?	who came ? Who did you call ?
Fayen?	where ? (where place ?)	fayen houm ?	where are they? ?
Layen?	where ? (in what direction?)	Layen rayḥin?	Where are they going ?

== Conjugation of Verbs and the Modal “ka” ==
Conjugation in this dialect differs from that of other Algerian Arabic varieties in two main ways: the confusion of gender (masculine and feminine) in the second person singular, and the use of modal particles before present-tense verbs.

Traditionally in Jijel, people say “nta/ntina” for a man or a woman, addressing both genders in the masculine. However, recently the use of “nti” for women has become more common, although the conjugation remains masculine. For example, one would say nti jit to mean “you came” (feminine), nti klit for “you ate,” nti khdemt for “you worked,” nti ku techri for “you buy,” nti ku tetmeskher for “you joke or mess around,” nti kul meaning “eat!” or nti eqra meaning “read!” and so on.

The other important feature of this dialect is, of course, the use of a modal particle placed before present-tense verbs. This modal changes according to the personal pronoun: it takes the form “ku” (pronounced kou) for the first and second person, singular and plural, and the form “ka” for the third person, singular and plural.

Person	Number	Modal
1st	Singular	ku ki
2nd	-	ku ki
3rd	-	ka ta
1st	Plural	ku ki
2nd	-	ku ki
3rd	-	ka ta

Illustration with the verb "to eat"

Singular	Plural
Ana kou nakel	Ḥna kou naklou
Ntsa kou tsakel	Ntsouma kou tsaklou
Ntsi kou tsakel	Ntsouma kou tsaklou
Houa ka yakel	Houma ka yaklou
Hia ka tsakel	Houma ka yaklou

It is believed that this modal comes from the Arabic verb “kaana” (ﻛﺎﻥ). This verb is conjugated in the past as kaana, kaanat, kaanou in the third person singular and plural, forms that all start with “ka,” while in the first and second persons singular and plural, it is conjugated as kount, kounta, kounti, kounna, kountoum, forms that begin with “kou.” It should also be noted that the forms “ki” are used instead of “ku” in the Taher region, and “tsa” is used instead of “ka” in the surroundings of Jijel and now also in Jijel itself, due to rural migration. Using the modal (ki / ka) gives:

Singular	Plural
Ana ki nakel	Ḥna ki naklou
Ntsa ki tsakel	Ntsouma ki tsaklou
Ntsi ki tsakel	Ntsouma ki tsaklou
Houa ka yakel	Houma ka yaklou
Hia ka tsakel	Houma ka yaklou

Finally, the verb “to be” in its simplified conjugation does not have the same form as in the most widely used Algerian Arabic (which uses forms such as ani, rani, ak, rak, aki, raki, aw, raw, ay, ray, ana, rana, akum, rakum, am, ram). In Jijelian Arabic it is even more simplified: it takes the form “aw” for all persons except hia and huma, where “am” is used. Illustration with the adjective “big” (kbir):

Singular	Plural
Ana aw kbir	Ḥna aw kbar
Ntsa aw kbir	Ntsouma aw kbar
Ntsi aw kbira	Ntsouma aw kbar
Houa aw kbir	Houma am kbar
Hia ay kbira	Houma am kbar

== Specific Nouns (those beginning with “a”) ==
Jijelian Arabic is distinguished by its vocabulary, which contains a large number of Berber words or Arabized Berber words. These are generally common nouns that begin with the letter “a.”

These nouns are always definite and never take “el” like other nouns; in a way, the initial “a” replaces “el.”

In the plural, they generally take the suffix “en” (when the word ends with a consonant) or “wen” / “iwen” (when the word ends with a vowel), while leaving the rest of the word unchanged. Here are a few examples :

Singularr	Translation	Plural
aghroum	bread	aghroumen
ajenouḥ	wing	ajenouḥen / lejnaweḥ
afroukh	bird	afroukhen / lefrawekh
aghenja	pot spoon	aghenjiwen
aqtot	cat	aqtoten / eqqtawet
arez	wasp / guêpes	arez
afkhoud	thigh	afkhouden / lefkhawed
awtoul	rabbit	awtoulen
agrou	toad	agrouwen
afoujal	corn	afoujal

It is observed that for some nouns beginning with “a,” the plural can have two forms: one with “en” / “wen” and another following the regular irregular plural patterns of Algerian Arabic (e.g., lefkhawed, lefrawekh, etc.). The existence of these two plural forms for certain nouns reflects a linguistic transition from Berber to Arabic in the region, which took place over several centuries. Over time, the Berber forms have been used less frequently in favor of the Arabic forms.

For some nouns beginning with “a,” there are also synonyms without the initial “a.” For example, to say “cat,” one can say either qett or aqtot. Similarly, to say “this cat,” one can say eq qett hada or aqtot hada. Other nouns, such as arez and afoujal, have no plural form because they refer to uncountable objects. They denote the entire species rather than an individual, and therefore always retain the same form.

== Some Specific Lexemes ==
This dialect contains a significant number of words that are specific to it and are not found in the rest of eastern Algeria, particularly certain common verbs. Here are a few examples:

Verb	Arabic transcription	English translation	Example	Translation
yedouḥ	يدوح	he is looking	dechdi ku tdouḥ ?	What are you looking for ?
yejber	يجبر	he finds	ana'w jbert-ha	I found it
yerfed	يرفد	he holds	erfed-ha fi yeddek	hold it in your hand
yεid	يعيد	he tells, he Reveals	ka yεid-li kifech dar	He explained to me how he did it
yetswaness	يتوانس	he discusses	idji tetwaness mεana	come chat with us
yettsfa	يتّفى	he yawns	ka yettsfa bezzaf	he yawns a lot
yezawed	يزاود	he sends back	am ka yezawdou fina !	They are sending us back!
yeḥmel	يحمل	he likes/he tolerates	ka tseḥmel seksou bel jaj	She likes chicken couscous.

== Particles “ḥa,” “d,” “di,” and “eddi” ==
The particle “ḥa” (ﺣﺎ) means “a” or “one”; it comes from the Arabic word “waḥed”, which denotes the number one. It is used in the Jijelian dialect and in other pre-Hilalian dialects such as Tlemcenian and Ghazaouet dialects. Most of the time, the “a” is not pronounced to facilitate liaison. For example: ḥ’errajel (“a man”), ḥ’emmra (“a woman”), ḥ’el khedma (“a job”), etc.

The particle “d” means “it is” or “these are”; it is used to introduce a person or an object. It comes from the Amazigh language—for example, in Kabyle it is pronounced “dh” (ﺫ)—but in Jijelian pronunciation it became “d” (ﺩ). Examples include: aw d ana (“it’s me”), aw d Hakim (“this is Hakim”), ay d ḥ’ebblad (“this is a country”), etc.

The particle “di” means “of”; it expresses possession. It is probably a shortened form of “dial,” a preposition that expresses possession in most pre-Hilalian and old urban dialects. In Jijel, “dial” is used only to mean “mine,” “yours,” etc. (e.g., diali, dialek, dialhem), while for other uses “di” is employed. Examples include: eddar di baba (“my father’s house”), ettriq d’Bjayya (“the road of Béjaia”). Another hypothesis suggests that “di” may have an Italian origin, since the region was long under the influence of the Italian maritime republics (Pisa and Genoa).

Finally, “eddi” corresponds simply to “elli” in other Algerian dialects and means “the one who / the one that.” In Standard Algerian Arabic, one would say, for example, hadak “elli” ybiε el batata, whereas in Jijelian it becomes hadak “eddi” ka ybiε batata.

== Djeha and the "bouzellouf" ==
Standard Algerian	Jijelian	Tasahlit	English
Waḥd nhar, Djeḥa medlou babah frank, bach yechri bouzellouf. Chrah, kla gaε leḥmou, bqa ghir l'εdam. Jabou l babah. ki chafou qallou: "wechnou hada?" qallou: "bouzellouf". -A chmata, win rahoum wednih ? -Kan trech. -Win rahoum εinih ? -Kan εwer. -Win rah lsanou ? -Kan εeggoun. -Ou jeldet rasou, win rahi ? -Kan fertas.	Ḥ'ennhar, Jeḥa εṭalou bouh frank, bich yechri ḥa bouzellouf. Chrah, kla el lḥem diylou belkel, qɛed ella l'ɛṭam. Jabou l bouh. Ki ra'h Callou "dichoua hada ?" Callou "d bouzellouf".: Ya echmatsa, fayen houm wednah ?; Kan ṣamm.; Fayen houma ɛinah ?; Kan εwar.; Fayen hou lsanou ?; Kan d ḥ'ebbekkuch.; W el jelwada di rasou, fayen hey ?; Kan msaltah.	Iǧǧen ubrid, Jeḥḥa ikfa-yas-ed i baba-nes frank, amka da yaseɣ azellaf. Isɣa-yat, icca aksum-nnes meṛṛa, iqqim dayen aɣes. Iwwi-yas-ed i baba-nes. Ma yat-iẓra inna-yas : " d acu d waha ? " Inna-yas : " d azellaf". -Ay amcum, anig llan imejjan-nes ?: Ttuɣ-at d amjuj.; -Ayen-hunt taṭṭiwan-nes ?: Ttuɣ-at d buderɣul.; -Ayen-hut alḥaḥ-nnes ?: Ttuɣ-at d agugam.; -D tasrat n ukerkur-nnes ayen-hit ?: Ttuɣ-at d aṣelduɛ.	One day, Jehha’s father gave him a franc so that he could buy a sheep’s head. He bought it, then ate all the meat. Only an empty carcass was left, which he brought to his father. When his father saw it, he exclaimed, “What is this?” Jehha replied, “The head of a sheep.”: “Rascal, where are its ears?” “He was deaf.” -“Where are its eyes?” “He was blind.” -“Where is its tongue?” “He was mute.” -“And the skin of its head, where is it?” “He was bald.”

== See also ==
- Varieties of Arabic
- Maghrebi Arabic
- Jebli Arabic
