= Jebli Arabic =

Arabic dialect of northern Morocco

Jebli
- جبلية
- Native to: Morocco
- Ethnicity: Jebala people, Ghomaras
- Language family: Afro-Asiatic: Semitic; Central Semitic; Arabic; Maghrebi Arabic; Pre-Hilalian; Jebli

Language codes
- ISO 639-3: (included in Moroccan Arabic [ary])
- Glottolog: jebl1238
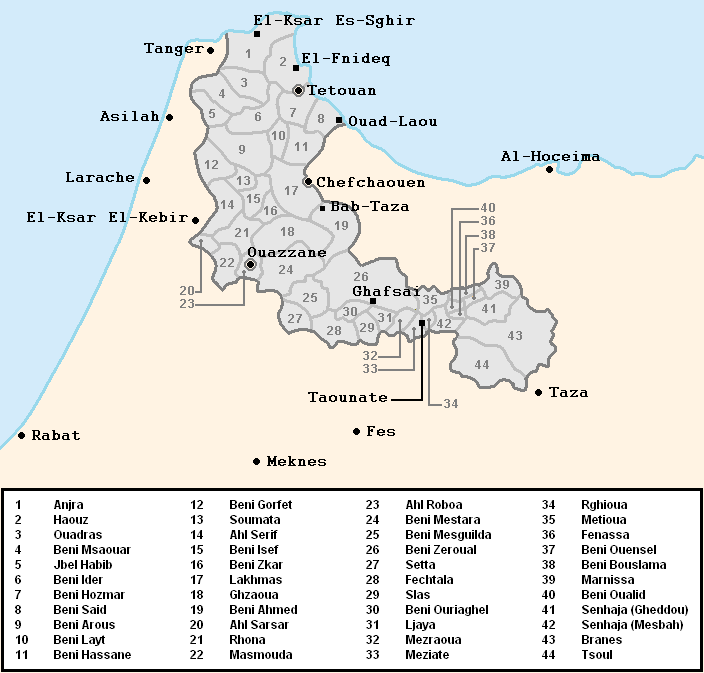

Jebli (Arabic: جبلية, romanized: Jebeliyyah; lit. 'of/from the mountain') is a pre-Hilalian Arabic dialect spoken in the Jebala region, a mountainous region in northwestern Morocco. It is considered a sedentary rural variety of Moroccan Arabic.

It is mainly spoken in the western Rif by tribes of Riffian, Berber, and Morisco descent, including by the Jebala people and eight Ghomara tribes, seven out of whom are fully Jebli-speaking. Three of the twelve Senhaja Srair tribes (Targuist, Aït Bouchibet, and Aït Gmil) and four out of twenty Riffian tribes also speak Jebli Arabic. Jebli is also spoken in the cities of Larache and Ouazzane. Although not belonging to the same ethnolinguistic group, the pre-Hilalian dialects spoken by the tribes of Zerhoun (Zerahnas) and Sefrou (Kechtala, Behalil, and Yazgha) are sometimes classified as belonging to the same macro-family (westernmost pre-Hilalian village dialects) as Jebli. The dialect of Tetouan is an urban non-Hilalian dialect which is distinct from Jebli, but the later has been spoken there since the 20th century due to migrations from nearby rural areas.

The dialect developed out of the Arabization of Berber tribes in the region during the 10th century AD. Jebli vocabulary and grammar is influenced by Berber; most of the words are Arabic, but the vocabulary is highly influenced by Spanish.

== Vocabulary examples ==
Jebli	English translation	Source language/etymology
trawzez	blue jeans	trousers (English)
assallas	darkness	asellas "darkness" (Berber)
karretēra	car road	carretera "paved road/highway" (Spanish)
ntina	you	(Classical Arabic)
âyyəl, ṭfel	boy	عائلة "family" (Classical Arabic); cf. Egyptian Arabic: ˤayyel "child" Or i3eyallen iyyalen in (Berber)
sṭiṭu	little	(Berber)
ħami	warm	حام "feverish" (Classical Arabic); cf. Iraqi Arabic: ħɑ̄mi "warm"
qayla	sun	قائلة "resting" (spec. at noon time); due to the time of rest when the sun was at its highest point at noon (Classical Arabic)
jjro	dog	jaru "puppy" (Classical Arabic)
yəmma	mom	(Berber)

== See also ==
- Varieties of Arabic
- Pre-Hilalian Arabic dialects
- Maghrebi Arabic
- Jijel Arabic
