= Pre-Hilalian Arabic dialects =

Continuum of dialects of Arabic from North Africa

Pre-Hilalian Arabic
- Region: Maghreb
- Language family: Afro-Asiatic: Semitic; West Semitic; Central Semitic; Arabic; Maghrebi Arabic; Pre-Hilalian Arabic
- Dialects: Urban; Jijel; Jebli; Judeo-Arabic (North African dialects); Sicilian (Maltese); Andalusi †; Tunisian; Fessi; Ceuta

Language codes
- ISO 639-3: –

Pre-Hilalian dialects also called Early Maghrebi Arabic are a continuum of Arabic dialects native to North Africa. They constitute, along with the Hilalian dialects, the larger Maghrebi Arabic family.

== History ==
Pre-Hilalian dialects are a result of early Arabization phases that lasted from the 7th to the 15th centuries, and that concerned the main urban settlements (Kairouan, Constantine, Tlemcen and Fez) and the neighboring harbors (respectively Mahdia and Sousse, Jijel and Collo, Rachgun and Honaine, and Peñón de Vélez de la Gomera and Tangier) particularly from Al Andalus influences, as well as the triangular areas between them.

This early Arabization also concerned various Jewish communities and a few urban centers outside the main Arabized areas, such as Tunis and Salé.

== Variants ==
Pre-Hilalian Arabic dialects are classified in three types:

- Pre-Hilalian Urban Arabic dialects: those of the major historical urban settlements such as Kairouan, Tunis, Constantine, Béjaïa, Algiers, Tlemcen, Taza, Fez, Rabat, Tétouan, Chefchaouen, and Tangier.
- "Village" and Mountain dialects: those of the areas between the four original urban settlements (Kairouan, Constantine, Tlemcen and Fez) and their respective harbors:
  - Sahili in the Sahel, Tunisia.
  - Old Sfaxian from Sfax, Tunisia.
  - Jijel Arabic in Petite Kabylie, Constantinois (eastern Algeria).
  - Trara Arabic in the Trara Mountains, Oranais (western Algeria).
  - Jebli Arabic in the southern and western part of the Rif, northern Morocco.
  - Ceuta Arabic in Ceuta, Spain.
- All the Judeo-Arabic languages of the Maghreb.

Two geographical groups of pre-Hilalian dialects are distinguished:

- Eastern dialects, those spoken in Tripolitania, Tunisia and the Constantinois, forming the ancient Ifriqiya.
- Western dialects, those spoken in the Algérois, Oranais and Morocco.

Additionally, the Maltese language is often classified as pre-Hilalian, since it shares many pre-Hilalian features.

Pre-Hilalian Urban dialects were formerly spoken in other cities such as Tripoli, Mascara and Azemmour, where they are extinct, replaced by the more widespread Hilalian dialects. Currently, many (Old) Urban dialects are endangered because of the prevalence of the Hilalian-based new urban koinés in everyday communication.

== See also ==
- Varieties of Arabic
- Hilalian dialects
- Maghrebi Arabic
