= Jebala (region) =

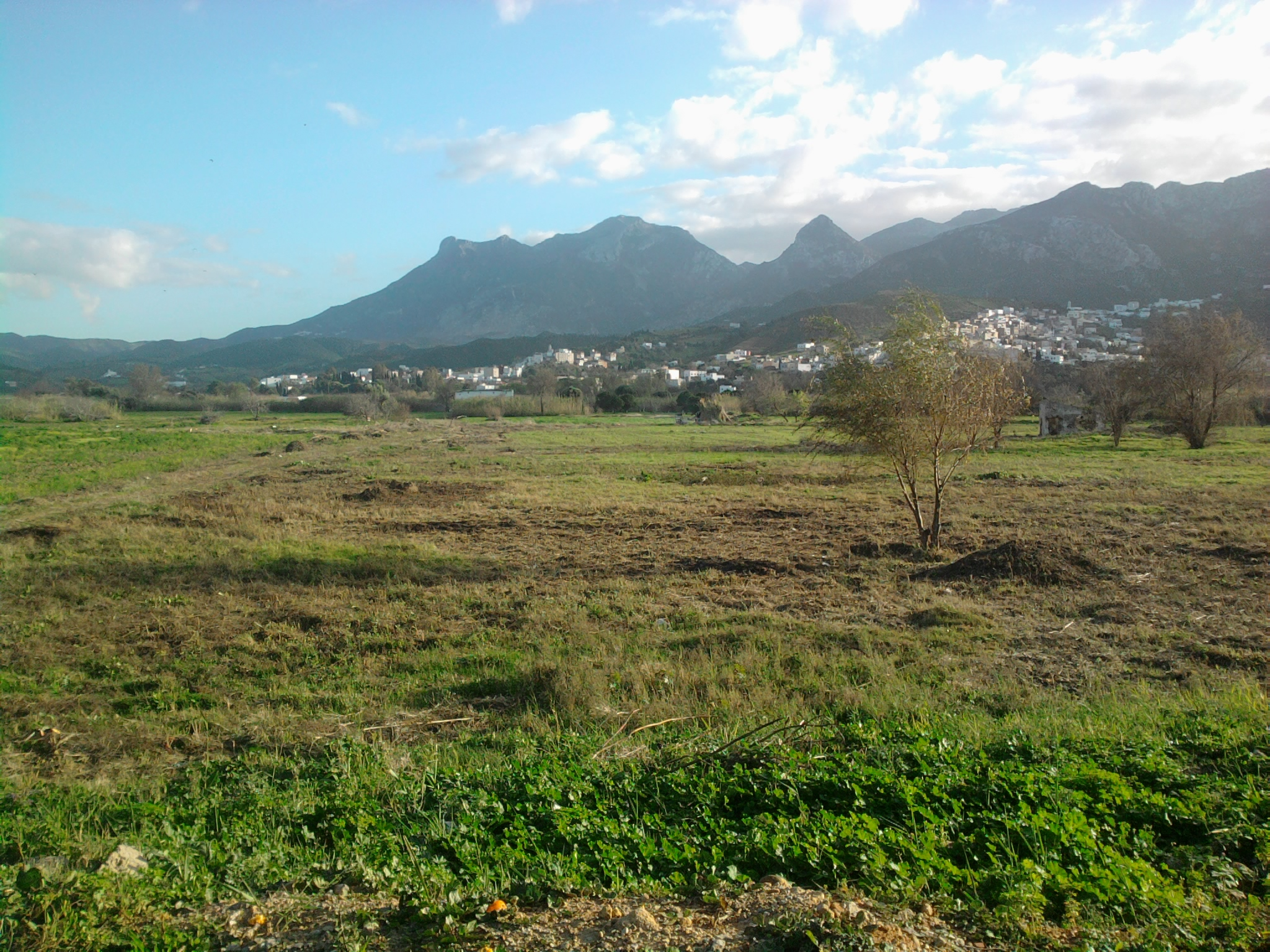

The Jebala region, sometimes spelled Jbala or Yebala, is a mountainous territory situated in the northwestern and north-central parts of the Kingdom of Morocco, running parallel to both the Mediterranean Sea and the Atlantic Ocean. It encompasses the entire southern coastline of the Strait of Gibraltar—lying a mere 14 kilometres (8.7 mi; 7.6 nmi) from its Iberian neighbor across the narrowest point between the two shores—while extending southward to reach the northern fringes of the Middle Atlas Mountains.

The rural population is primarily composed of the Jebala people, an ethnic group descended from the Arabic-speaking Berbers from whom the region derives its name.

== Plant and animal resources ==
The region's diverse topography and natural conditions have endowed it with a significant array of natural resources, encompassing both flora and fauna. Forest cover in the region spans 669,437 hectares (1,654,210 acres), accounting for approximately 28 percent of the region's total land area and 14 percent of Morocco's entire forest estate.

== Origin of the name ==
The term "Jebala" or "Jbala" emerged in the 16th or 17th century to designate this region of northern Morocco, effectively replacing the older name "Gomara"—a designation transmitted by historians such as Al-Bakri, Ibn Khaldun, and Leo Africanus. The Atlantic plains stretching from Tangier to Larache are historically referred to by the term "Habt". The population that Ibn Khaldun identifies as the "Gomara" corresponds roughly to the boundaries of present-day Jebala; they were a Berber people belonging to a larger tribal confederation known as the Masmuda—itself a Berber group.
