= Pre-Hilalian Urban Arabic dialects =

Continuum of dialects of Arabic from North Africa

The Pre-Hilalian Urban Arabic dialects are a continuum of Arabic dialects native to North Africa. They constitute, along with the Pre-Hilalian dialects, the larger Maghrebi Arabic family, and result from the first phase of Arabization in the area - before the 12th century - as well as from the establishment of communities of refugees from Al-Andalus, whose languages were close to it.

These dialects are to be distinguished from modern urban koinés, the majority in cities, resulting from the establishment of populations of rural origin in the city and whose characteristics are mainly Hilalian.

Like all Pre-Hilalian dialects, the Pre-Hilalian Urban dialects belong to two distinct groups: a first group is related to Eastern Pre-Hilalian dialects (Constantinois, Tunisia and Tripolitania, corresponding to the old Ifriqiya), characterized by the preservation of three long vowels, while that the second group is related to Western dialects (Algiers, Oran and Morocco), characterized by the existence of two long vowels and having developed an indefinite article by combining the Arabic numeral waḥed (one) and the definite article el- (example : waḥed el-mra - "a woman", lit. "one the woman").

== See also ==
- Pre-Hilalian Arabic dialects
