= Imāla =

Vowel shift in many Arabic dialects

Imāla (also imālah; Arabic: إمالة, lit. 'inclination') is a phenomenon in Arabic comprising the fronting and raising of Old Arabic /aː/ toward /iː/ or /eː/, and the old short /a/ toward /i/. Imāla and the factors conditioning its occurrence were described for the first time by Sibawayh. According to as-Sirafi and Ibn Jinni (10th century), the vowel of the imāla was pronounced somewhere between /a/ and /i/, suggesting a realization of [e].

Sibawayh primarily discusses imāla as a shift of /aː/ to /eː/ in the vicinity of /i/ or /iː/, an allophonic variation that can be characterized as umlaut or i-mutation. Additionally, Sibawayh's imāla subsumes occurrences of a phonemic vowel /eː/ resulting from the collapse of Old Arabic triphthongs. For this reason, not all instances of imāla can be characterized as a vowel shift from an original /aː/ towards the /iː/.

Imāla was not a general phenomenon, occurring only in some of the old dialects. Yet, the grammarians regarded it as a legitimate phenomenon from the normative point of view when it occurred in certain conditionings. In the context of Arabic dialectology, the term imāla is also used to describe a variety of phenomena involving mid-vowels in place of the Standard Arabic low-vowel. Imāla also features in several qirāʾāt (styles of recitation) of the Quran.

== Imāla in the grammatical tradition ==
Sibawayh's description of imāla is based on the linguistic situation prevailing in his time and environment, mainly al-Basra and its surroundings in southern Iraq. This is confirmed by evidence in the Kitāb. The description of imāla by all later grammarians is based on that of Sibawayh. Historically and anciently, imāla was a feature in both verbs and inflected nouns. There are several processes which the term imāla describes, of the most common are outlined below:

=== i-mutation ===
The type of imāla which figures most prominently in Sibawayh's discussion is the shift of /aː/ to /eː/ in the vicinity of /i/ or /iː/. The shift is blocked whenever there are emphatic or uvular consonants (ṣ, ḍ, ṭ, ẓ, ġ, q, x) adjacent to the /aː/ or following it, but is not blocked if the umlaut-triggering /i/ stands between the blocking consonant and a following /aː/. The blocking effect of emphatics is shown in the following examples:

- Reflexes of CāCiC: ʿēbid 'worshipper' vs. ḍāmin 'guarantor'
- Reflexes of CaCāCiC: masēǧid 'mosques' vs. maʿāliq 'pluck of animals'
- Reflexes of CaCāCīC: mafētīḥ 'keys' vs. manāfīx 'bellows'

=== III-w/y imāla ===
Sibawayh says that nouns with final root consonant w (III-w) do not undergo imāla, eg. qafā 'back', ʿaṣā 'stick'. On the other hand, nouns with root-final y (III-y) and feminine nouns with suffix -y undergo imāla, eg. miʿzē 'goat', ḥublē 'pregnant'. Such imāla is not blocked by emphatic consonants, eg. muʿṭē 'gifted'.

According to Sibawayh, a similar imāla applies to defective verbs regardless of the underlying root consonant: ġazē (III-w) 'he raided', ramē 'he threw' (III-y). However other grammarians describe varieties in which imāla applies to III-y verbs, but not III-w verbs. Sibawayh also describes a system in which only III-y nouns and feminine nouns with suffix -y have imāla, it being absent from verbs altogether.

=== II-w/y imāla ===
According to Sibawayh, imāla is applied to hollow verbs (II-w or II-y) whose 1sg has an /i/ vowel, such as xēfa (1sg xiftu) and ǧēʾa (1sg ǧiʾtu). Sibawayh said that this was the practice for some people of Hijaz. Additionally, al-Farra' said that this was the practice of the common people of Najd, among whom are Tamim, Asad, and Qays.

== Imāla in Quranic recitation ==
Many qirāʾāt of the Quran implement imāla at least once. Some, like those of Hafs or Qalun, use it only once, but in others, imāla affects hundreds of words because of a general rule of a specific qirāʾa or as a specific word prescribed to undergo imāla.

=== Lexically determined i-mutation ===
While i-mutation is non-phonemic in Sibawayh's description, its occurrences in the Quranic reading traditions are highly lexically determined. For example, Hisham and Ibn Dhakwan apply i-mutation to CaCāCiC plural mašēribu 'drinks' (Q36:73) but not al-ǧawāriḥi 'the predators' (Q5:4) or manāzila 'positions' (Q36:39).

=== III-w/y imāla ===
Al-Kisaʾi and Hamza are known for having phonemic /eː/ as the realization of alif maqsura in III-y nouns and verbs, as well as in derived final-weak forms and forms having the feminine ending written with -y, such as ḥublē 'pregnant'. Warsh, from the way of al-Azraq, realizes this extra phoneme as [æː].

Other readers apply this imāla only sporadically: Hafs reads it only once in maǧrē-hā (Q11:41). Šubah only has it in reʾē 'he saw', ramē 'he threw', and aʿmē 'blind' in its two attestations in Q17:72.

=== II-w/y imāla ===
Hamza applies imāla to zēda 'to increase', šēʾa 'to want', ǧēʾa 'to come', xēba 'to fail', rēna 'to seize', xēfa 'to fear', zēġa 'to wander', ṭēba 'to be good', ḍēqa 'to taste' and ḥēqa 'to surround'. Some irregular lexical exceptions where Hamza does not apply it include māta 'he died', kālū-hum 'they measured them', zālat 'she ceased', and zāġat 'she wandered'.

== Imāla in modern Arabic dialects ==
=== i-mutation ===
In the modern qeltu dialects of Iraq and Anatolia and in the modern dialect of Aleppo, the factors conditioning medial imāla (i-mutation) correspond to those described by Sibawayh in the 8th century. In these modern dialects, medial imāla occurs when the historical vowel of the syllable adjacent to /aː/ was /i/ or /iː/. For instance:

- *kilāb > klēb 'dogs' in Christian Baghdadi, Mosul, Anatolia, and Aleppo
- *jāmiʿ > jēməʿ 'mosque' in Christian Baghdadi, Mosul, and Anatolia
- *sakākīn > sakēkīn 'knives' in the Jewish dialect of Mosul.

It does not occur in the proximity of ə < *a or ə < *u, however:

- *xabbāz > xəbbāz 'baker' in Jewish Baghdadi
- *sukkān > səkkān 'inhabitants' in Jewish Baghdadi.

In addition to the mentioned dialects, this type of medial imāla occurs in the qeltu dialect of Deir ez-Zor, the dialects of Hatay and Cilicia in Turkey, and the dialects of some Bedouin tribes in the Negev.

=== North African mutation ===
==== ē-mutation ====
Standard Tunisian features Imala by default when onset and coda of the syllable in question are light consonants (any other than ḍ, ḡ, ʕ, ḥ, ḵ, q, r, ṣ, ṭ and w) where Arabic onset /aː/ morphs into /eː/:

- mafātīḥ > mfētaḥ 'keys'
- tunāqišu > tnēqeš 'you discuss'
- naʔḵuḏu > nēḵu 'I take'
- yaʔsiru > yēser 'too much'
- imāla(tun) > ymēlə 'Imāla'

The realization /eː/ is in allophonic distribution where, chiefly, speakers from Sfax and Coastal and North Eastern regions pronounce it [e̞ː] and speakers from otherwise regions pronounce it [æː] or [εː]; both distinctly from [ɐː] that is instead the result of heavy vowel coloring.

In some North Eastern varieties, such as Msaken variety, Imala can be extreme such that [e̞ː] shifting to [iː]. Comapre mi instead of me for 'water' and smi instead of sme for 'sky'.

==== ī-mutation ====
A pattern constructed as C_{1}oC_{2}C_{2}ēC_{3}(æ) (where æ is a or ə), from a root {C_{1},C_{2},C_{3}}, often morphs ē into ī.

- {ḥ,r,q} ("to burn, to sting") would make ḥorrīqa meaning "little stinging thing"; which narrowly refers to stinger jellyfish or nettles.
- {s,w,d} ("to be black") would make sowwīdə meaning "little black thing".

Some varieties across the country keep it ē.

==== Sfax drawling ====
Another phenomenon occurs in Sfaxi variety where an /aː/ that follows heavy consonants shifts into [α~ɒ] with changing the stress. For example, ḡāli is pronounced [ˈʁɐː.li] in Standard Tunisian but [ʁɒ(ː).ˈli] in Sfaxi.

==== Qāla-mutation ====
Speakers from Northeast, Coast and Sfax, often referred to as Qāla speakers, pronounce it (-)qā- and -qa (resp. [(-)qɐː- ~ (-)qαː- ~ (-)qɒː-] and [-qɐ]) while speakers from other regions use equivalent (-)gē- and -gə (resp. [(-)ge̞ː- ~ (-)gεː- ~ (-)gæː-] and [-gə]) respectively.

=== III-w/y imāla ===
Sibawayh's description of the final imāla (III-w/y imāla) is also, in general, similar to that prevailing in the modern qəltu dialects and in the dialect of Aleppo. One of the most striking points of resemblance is that in some dialects in Sibawayh's time, this final imāla occurred only in nouns and adjectives, and not in verbs; in the modern qəltu dialects and in Aleppo the situation is exactly the same, as illustrated by the examples sakāġi (< *sakārē) 'drunk (pl.)' and aʿmi (< *aʿmē) 'blind' vs. bana (< *banā) 'he built'.

=== Consonantally conditioned medial imāla ===
Many modern dialects outside Iraq have an imāla completely conditioned by the consonantal environment of /aː/. This type of imāla does not correspond to any type mentioned by Sibawayh. It occurs in many Lebanese dialects, in the Druze dialects of Hauran and the Golan, in the dialects of the Syrian desert oases Qariten and Palmyra, in the Bedouin dialects of Sahil Maryut in Egypt, and in the Jabali dialect of Cyrenaica.

== Effect on other languages ==
The accent of Andalusia in Moorish Spain featured imāla, and many Arabic loanwords and city names in Spanish still do so. A notable example is the name of Andalusia's largest city, Seville, deriving from the Arabic Išbīliya, from the Latin Hispalis.

== See also ==
- Tenseness
- Vowel height
- Andalusian Arabic
- North Levantine Arabic
- Tunisian Arabic
- North Mesopotamian Arabic
