= Jordanian Arabic =

Variety of Levantine Arabic spoken in the Kingdom of Jordan

- اللهجة الأردنية
- Native to: Jordan
- Native speakers: 9.9 million (2022)
- Language family: Afro-Asiatic: Semitic; West; Central; Arabic; Levantine; Jordanian Arabic
- Dialects: Fellahi (rural); Madani (urban)
- Writing system: Arabic alphabet

Language codes
- ISO 639-3: (covered by apc)
- Glottolog: sout3123 east2690
- IETF: apc-JO
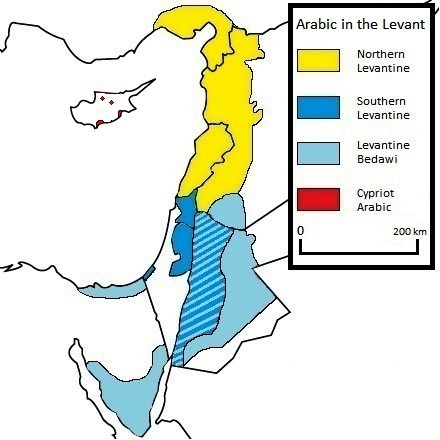
- South Levantine Levantine Bedawi

Jordanian Arabic is a dialect continuum of mutually intelligible varieties of Arabic spoken in Jordan.

Jordanian Arabic can be divided into sedentary and Bedouin varieties. Sedentary varieties belong to the Levantine Arabic dialect continuum. Bedouin varieties are further divided into two groups, Northwest Arabian Arabic varieties of the south, and Najdi Arabic and Shawi Arabic varieties of the north. Jordanian Arabic incorporates vocabulary and expressions influenced by neighboring dialects, including those from Palestine, Syria, Iraq and Saudi Arabia.

Arabic is a member of the Semitic language family. Jordanian Arabic varieties are spoken by more than 8.5 million people, and understood throughout the Levant and, to various extents, in other Arabic-speaking regions. As in all Arab countries, language use in Jordan is characterized by diglossia; Modern Standard Arabic is the official language used in most written documents and the media, while daily conversation is conducted in the local colloquial varieties.

== Regional Jordanian Arabic varieties ==
Although there is a common Jordanian dialect mutually understood by most Jordanians, the daily language spoken throughout the country varies significantly through regions. These variants impact altogether pronunciation, grammar, and vocabulary.

Jordanian Arabic can primarily be divided into sedentary and Bedouin varieties, each of which can be further divided into distinct subgroups:

Sedentary varieties

- Hybrid variety (Modern Jordanian)/Ammani: It is the most current spoken language among Jordanians. This variety was born after the designation of Amman as capital of the Jordanian kingdom early in the 20th century. It is the result of the merger of the language of populations who moved from northern Jordan, southern Jordan, Saudi Arabia and later from Palestine. For this reason, it mixes features of the Arabic varieties spoken by these populations. The emergence of the language occurred under the strong influence of the northern Jordanian dialect. As in many countries English is used to substitute many technical words, even though these words have Arabic counterparts in modern standard Arabic.
- Balgawi-Horani: Mostly spoken in the area from Amman to Irbid in the far north. As in all sedentary areas, local variations are many. The pronunciation has /q/ pronounced [g] and /k/ mostly ([tʃ]). This dialect is part of the southern dialect of the Levantine Arabic language.
- Southern/Moab: Spoken in the area south of Amman, in cities such as Karak, Tafilah, Ma'an, Shoubak and their countrysides, it is replete with city-to-city and village-to-village differences. In this dialect, the pronunciation of the final vowel (æ~a~ə) commonly written with tāʾ marbūtah (ة) is raised to [e]. For example, Maktaba (Fuṣḥa) becomes Maktabe (Moab), Maktabeh (North) and Mektaba (Bedawi). Named after the ancient Moab kingdom that was located in southern Jordan, this dialect belongs to the outer southern dialect of the Levantine Arabic language.
- Aqaba variety

Bedouin varieties

- Northwest Arabian Arabic: Spoken by the Hwetat, Bani Atiya, the Bdul of Petra, and N'emat tribes in Southern Jordan. According to Palva, the dialects spoken in Jordan belong to the Eastern group of NWA dialects. Nevertheless, the dialects of the Bdul and N'emat share features with the Western group of NWA dialects spoken in the Negev. In addition, the dialect of the Zawaida tribe is argued to be closely related to Negev Arabic.
- North Arabian dialects: Spoken by the Sirhan, Bani Saxar, and Bani Khalid tribes. They are further divided into Anazi-type dialects which are related to Central Najdi Arabic, and Shammari-type dialects which are related to Northern Najdi Arabic.
- Syro-Mesopotamian Bedouin dialects: These dialects show many similarities with Iraqi “gelet”-dialects and with Gulf Arabic. Herin divides this group into a Central “ygulu” and Northern “ygulun” Shawi Arabic, both types being identical except for the presence of /n/ in the plural imperfect of the latter group. The Central “ygulu” dialects are spoken by the Ajarma, Adwan, and Ababid tribes.

=== Social dynamics ===
In addition to geographic differences, social variables such as gender correlate with variation in Jordanian Arabic. Research on public and social media contexts reports higher rates of politeness markers and indirect requests among women, and higher rates of direct forms among men. The size and direction of these differences vary by audience, topic, and platform.

== Phonology ==
=== Consonants ===
| | | Labial | Interdental | | Dental/Alveolar | | Palatal | Velar | Pharyngeal | Glottal |
| | | Labial | plain | emph. | plain | emph. | Palatal | Velar | Pharyngeal | Glottal |
|---|---|---|---|---|---|---|---|---|---|---|
| Nasal | | m | | | n | | | | | |
| Stop | voiceless | | | | t | tˤ | (t͡ʃ) | k | | ʔ |
| Stop | voiced | b | | | d | dˤ | d͡ʒ | ɡ | | |
| Fricative | voiceless | f | θ | | s | sˤ | ʃ | x | ħ | h |
| Fricative | voiced | | ð | ðˤ | z | | (ʒ) | ɣ | ʕ | |
| Tap/Trill | | | | | ɾ ~ r | | | | | |
| Approximant | | | | | l | | j | w | | |

- /d͡ʒ/ is realized as a voiced fricative /ʒ/, across different speakers and dialects.
- /t͡ʃ/ is a lexically distributed alternant of /k/ in sedentary Horani/Balqawi dialects. [t͡ʃ] is historically also an allophone of /k/ in the Syro-Mesopotamian Bedouin dialects.

=== Vowels ===
| | Front | Central | Back |
|---|---|---|---|
| Close | i iː | | u uː |
| Mid | (e) eː | | (o) oː |
| Open | | a aː | |

- /e/ and /i/ are only contrastive word-finally as shown by the minimal pair kalbe “dog (f.)” and kalbi “my dog”.
- /o/ and /u/ are only contrastive word-finally as shown by the minimal pair katabo “he wrote it” vs. katabu “they wrote”.
- /i u/ can be heard as [ɪ, ʊ] in lax form.
- /a/ can occur as a back [ɑ] mostly after /r/, an open-front [a] before /r/, and as [ɛ] in word-final positions, except after velarized, emphatic, back or pharyngeal sounds.
- /aː/ is heard within the position or /r/ as a long back [ɑː] or front [æː] among speakers. Among people who are first generation, Palestinian-dialect speakers, it can also be heard as [eː].
- A central [ə] can be epenthetic within some long vowel sounds like /eː/ as [eːə].

=== Stress ===
One syllable of every Jordanian word has more stress than the other syllables of that word. Some meaning is communicated in Jordanian by the location of the stress of the vowel. So, changing the stress position changes the meaning (e.g. ['katabu] means they wrote while [kata'bu] means they wrote it). This means one has to listen and pronounce the stress carefully.

== Grammar ==
=== Nominal morphology ===
==== Definiteness ====
/il-/ is used in most words that don't start with a vowel. It is affixed onto the following word. Il-bāb meaning the door. /iC-/ is used in words that start with a consonant produced by the blade of the tongue (t, ṭ, d, ḍ, r, z, ẓ, ž, s, ṣ, š, n. Sometimes [l] and [j] as well depending on the dialect). This causes a doubling of the consonant. This e is pronounced as in a rounded short backward vowel or as in an e followed by the first letter of the word that follows the article. For example: ed-desk meaning the desk, ej-jakét meaning the jacket, es-seks meaning the sex or hāda' et-téléfón meaning that is the telephone.

=== Pronouns ===
Contrary to MSA, dual pronouns do not exist in Jordanian; the plural is used instead. Because conjugated verbs indicate the subject with a prefix or a suffix, independent subject pronouns are usually unnecessary and mainly used for emphasis. Feminine plural forms modifying human females are found primarily in rural and Bedouin areas.

Jordanian Arabic independent personal pronouns
| | | Amman | Salt |
|---|---|---|---|
| 1st person sg. (m/f) | | ana | ana ~ ani |
| 2nd person sg. | m | inta | int ~ inte |
| 2nd person sg. | f | inti | inti |
| 3rd person sg, | m | huwwe | hū ~ huwwe |
| 3rd person sg, | f | hiyye | hī ~ hiyye |
| 1st person pl. (m/f) | | niḥna / iḥna | iḥna |
| 2nd person pl. | m | intu | intu |
| 2nd person pl. | f | intu | intin |
| 3rd person pl. | m | humme | hummu |
| 3rd person pl. | f | humme | hinne |

Bound pronouns typically attach to nouns, prepositions, verbs andalso to certain adverbs, conjunctions and other discourse markers:

Jordanian Arabic bound pronouns
| | | Amman | | Salt | |
| | | after-C | after-V | after-C | after-V |
|---|---|---|---|---|---|
| 1st person sg. (m/f) | | -i, -ni | -y | -i, -ni | -y(e) |
| 2nd person sg. | m | -ak | -k | -ak | -k |
| 2nd person sg. | f | -ik | -ki | -ič | -č |
| 3rd person sg, | m | -o | -(h) | -o | -(h) |
| 3rd person sg, | f | -ha | | -ha | |
| 1st person pl. (m/f) | | -na | | -na | |
| 2nd person pl. | m | -kum | | -ku | |
| 2nd person pl. | f | -kum | | -čin | |
| 3rd person pl. | m | -hum | | -hum | |
| 3rd person pl. | f | -hum | | -hin | |

Indirect object / dative pronouns arise from the merging of l- “for, to”, and the bound pronouns. Note that geminated forms like Ammani after-CC katabt-illo “I wrote for him” are not to be found in Salti, which has katab(ə)t-lo:

Jordanian Arabic indirect object / dative pronouns
| | | Amman | | | Salt | |
| | | after-V | after-C | after-CC | after-V | after-C |
|---|---|---|---|---|---|---|
| 1st person sg. (m/f) | | -li | | -illi | -li | |
| 2nd person sg. | m | -lak | | -illak | -lak | |
| 2nd person sg. | f | -lik | | -illik | -lič | |
| 3rd person sg, | m | -lo | | -illo | -lo | |
| 3rd person sg, | f | -lha | -ilha | | -lha | -ilha |
| 1st person pl. (m/f) | | -lna | -ilna | | -lna (-nna) | -ilna (-inna) |
| 2nd person pl. | m | -lkum | -ilkum | | -lku | -ilku |
| 2nd person pl. | f | -lkum | -ilkum | | -lčin | -ilčin |
| 3rd person pl. | m | -lhum | -ilhum | | -lhum | -ilhum |
| 3rd person pl. | f | -lhum | -ilhum | | -lhin | -ilhin |

Demonstratives can appear pre-nominally or post-nominally

Jordanian Arabic demonstrative pronouns
| | | | Amman | Salt |
|---|---|---|---|---|
| Near | sg. | m | hād(a) | hāḏ(a), hāḏ̣(a) |
| Near | sg. | f | hāy ~ hādi | hāy(e) ~ hāḏi |
| Near | pl. | m | hadōl | haḏōl(a), haḏ̣ōl(a) |
| Near | pl. | f | hadōl | haḏōl(a), haḏ̣ōl(a) |
| Far | sg. | m | hadāk | haḏāk(a), haḏ̣āk(a) |
| Far | sg. | f | hadīk | haḏīč(e) |
| Far | pl. | m | hadolāk | haḏ(o)lāk(a), haḏ̣(o)lāk(a) |
| Far | pl. | f | hadolāk | haḏ(o)lāk(a), haḏ̣(o)lāk(a) |

=== Verbal morphology ===
==== Form I ====
===== Strong verbs =====
In Amman, Form I strong verbs usually have perfect CaCaC with imperfect CCuC/CCaC, and perfect CiCiC with imperfect CCaC. In Salt, CaCaC and CiCiC can occur with imperfect CCiC.

Form I Strong (CaCaC/CCuC)
| | | | Amman | Salt |
|---|---|---|---|---|
| Perfect (CaCaC) | 1st person sg. (m/f) | | daras(i)t | maragt |
| Perfect (CaCaC) | 2nd person sg. | m | daras(i)t | maragt |
| Perfect (CaCaC) | 2nd person sg. | f | darasti | maragti |
| Perfect (CaCaC) | 3rd person sg, | m | daras | marag |
| Perfect (CaCaC) | 3rd person sg, | f | darsat | margat |
| Perfect (CaCaC) | 1st person pl. (m/f) | | darasna | maragna |
| Perfect (CaCaC) | 2nd person pl. | m | darastu | maragtu |
| Perfect (CaCaC) | 2nd person pl. | f | darastu | maragtin |
| Perfect (CaCaC) | 3rd person pl. | m | darasu | maragu |
| Perfect (CaCaC) | 3rd person pl. | f | darasu | maragin |
| Imperfect (CCuC) | 1st person sg. (m/f) | | adrus, badrus | amrug, bamrug |
| Imperfect (CCuC) | 2nd person sg. | m | tudrus, btudrus | tumrug, btumrug |
| Imperfect (CCuC) | 2nd person sg. | f | tudrusi, btudrusi | tumurgi, btumurgi |
| Imperfect (CCuC) | 3rd person sg, | m | yudrus, b(y)udrus | yumrug, bumrug |
| Imperfect (CCuC) | 3rd person sg, | f | tudrus, btudrus | tumrug, btumrug |
| Imperfect (CCuC) | 1st person pl. (m/f) | | nudrus, bnudrus | numrug, mnumrug |
| Imperfect (CCuC) | 2nd person pl. | m | tudrusu, btudrusu | tumurgu, btumurgu |
| Imperfect (CCuC) | 2nd person pl. | f | tudrusu, btudrusu | tumurgin, btumurgin |
| Imperfect (CCuC) | 3rd person pl. | m | yudrusu, b(y)udrusu | yumurgu, bumurgu |
| Imperfect (CCuC) | 3rd person pl. | f | yudrusu, b(y)udrusu | yumurgin, bumurgin |

Form I Strong (CiCiC/CCaC)
| | | | Amman | Salt |
|---|---|---|---|---|
| Perfect (CiCiC) | 1st person sg. (m/f) | | kbirt | gdirt |
| Perfect (CiCiC) | 2nd person sg. | m | kbirt | gdirt |
| Perfect (CiCiC) | 2nd person sg. | f | kbirti | gdirti |
| Perfect (CiCiC) | 3rd person sg, | m | kibir | gidir |
| Perfect (CiCiC) | 3rd person sg, | f | kibrat | gidrat |
| Perfect (CiCiC) | 1st person pl. (m/f) | | kbirna | gdirna |
| Perfect (CiCiC) | 2nd person pl. | m | kbirtu | gdirtu |
| Perfect (CiCiC) | 2nd person pl. | f | kbirtu | gdirtin |
| Perfect (CiCiC) | 3rd person pl. | m | kibru | gidru |
| Perfect (CiCiC) | 3rd person pl. | f | kibru | gidrin |
| Imperfect (CCaC) | 1st person sg. (m/f) | | akbar, bakbar | agdar, bagdar |
| Imperfect (CCaC) | 2nd person sg. | m | tikbar, btikbar | tigdar, btigdar |
| Imperfect (CCaC) | 2nd person sg. | f | tikbari, btikbari | tigdari, btigdari |
| Imperfect (CCaC) | 3rd person sg, | m | yikbar, b(y)ikbar | yigdar, bigdar |
| Imperfect (CCaC) | 3rd person sg, | f | tikbar, btikbar | tigdar, btigdar |
| Imperfect (CCaC) | 1st person pl. (m/f) | | nikbar, bnikbar | nigdar, mnigdar |
| Imperfect (CCaC) | 2nd person pl. | m | tikbaru, btikbaru | tigdaru, btigdaru |
| Imperfect (CCaC) | 2nd person pl. | f | tikbaru, btikbaru | tigdarin, btigdarin |
| Imperfect (CCaC) | 3rd person pl. | m | yikbaru, b(y)ikbaru | yigdaru, bigdaru |
| Imperfect (CCaC) | 3rd person pl. | f | yikbaru, b(y)ikbaru | yigdarin, bigdarin |

===== Geminated verbs =====
Geminate verbs generally have perfect CaCC and imperfect CiCC. In Amman and Salt, the 2nd person singular masculine and the 1st person singular perfect inflect as CaCCēt: ḥassēt, šaddēt. In Amman, the active participle alternates between CāCC and CāCC (ḥāss and ḥāsis). In Salt, only CāCC (ḥāss) is present.

===== Verbs Iʾ =====
Form I Weak Iʾ
| | | | Amman | Salt |
|---|---|---|---|---|
| Perfect (CaCaC) | 1st person sg. (m/f) | | ʾakalt | ʾakalt |
| Perfect (CaCaC) | 2nd person sg. | m | ʾakalt | ʾakalt |
| Perfect (CaCaC) | 2nd person sg. | f | ʾakalti | ʾakalti |
| Perfect (CaCaC) | 3rd person sg, | m | ʾakal | ʾakal |
| Perfect (CaCaC) | 3rd person sg, | f | ʾaklat | ʾaklat |
| Perfect (CaCaC) | 1st person pl. (m/f) | | ʾakalna | ʾakalna |
| Perfect (CaCaC) | 2nd person pl. | m | ʾakaltu | ʾakaltu |
| Perfect (CaCaC) | 2nd person pl. | f | ʾakaltu | ʾakaltin |
| Perfect (CaCaC) | 3rd person pl. | m | ʾakalu | ʾakalu |
| Perfect (CaCaC) | 3rd person pl. | f | ʾakalu | ʾakalin |
| Imperfect | 1st person sg. (m/f) | | ākul, bākul | ʾōkil, bōkil |
| Imperfect | 2nd person sg. | m | tākul~tōkil, btākul~btōkil | tōkil, btōkil |
| Imperfect | 2nd person sg. | f | tākli~tōkli, btākli~btōkli | tōkli, btōkli |
| Imperfect | 3rd person sg, | m | yākul~yōkil, byākul~b(y)ōkil | yōkil, bōkil |
| Imperfect | 3rd person sg, | f | tākul~tōkil, btākul~btōkil | tōkil, btōkil |
| Imperfect | 1st person pl. (m/f) | | nākul~nōkil, bnākul~bnōkil | nōkil, mnōkil |
| Imperfect | 2nd person pl. | m | tāklu~tōklu, btāklu~btōklu | tōklu, btōklu |
| Imperfect | 2nd person pl. | f | tāklu~tōklu, btāklu~btōklu | tōklin, btōklin |
| Imperfect | 3rd person pl. | m | yāklu~yōklu, byāklu~b(y)ōklu | yōklu, bōklu |
| Imperfect | 3rd person pl. | f | yāklu~yōklu, byāklu~b(y)ōklu | yōklin, bōklin |

===== Verbs Iw/y =====
Note that Salt forms the perfect on a different template than Amman. In any case, the perfect is conjugated as a strong verb:

Form I Weak Iw/y
| | | | Amman | Salt |
|---|---|---|---|---|
| Perfect | 1st person sg. (m/f) | | wṣil(i)t | waṣalt |
| Perfect | 2nd person sg. | m | wṣil(i)t | waṣalt |
| Perfect | 2nd person sg. | f | wṣilti | waṣalti |
| Perfect | 3rd person sg, | m | wiṣil | waṣal |
| Perfect | 3rd person sg, | f | wiṣlat | waṣlat |
| Perfect | 1st person pl. (m/f) | | wṣilna | waṣalna |
| Perfect | 2nd person pl. | m | wṣiltu | waṣaltu |
| Perfect | 2nd person pl. | f | wṣiltu | waṣaltin |
| Perfect | 3rd person pl. | m | wiṣlu | waṣalu |
| Perfect | 3rd person pl. | f | wiṣlu | waṣalin |
| Imperfect | 1st person sg. (m/f) | | ʾawṣal, bawṣal | ʾaṣal, baṣal |
| Imperfect | 2nd person sg. | m | tuwṣal, btuwṣal | taṣal, btaṣal |
| Imperfect | 2nd person sg. | f | tuwṣali, btuwṣali | taṣali, btaṣali |
| Imperfect | 3rd person sg, | m | yuwṣal, b(y)uwṣal | yaṣal~yiṣal, baṣal |
| Imperfect | 3rd person sg, | f | tuwṣal, btuwṣal | taṣal, btaṣal |
| Imperfect | 1st person pl. (m/f) | | nuwṣal, bnuwṣal | naṣal, mnaṣal |
| Imperfect | 2nd person pl. | m | tuwṣalu, btuwṣalu | taṣalu, btaṣalu |
| Imperfect | 2nd person pl. | f | tuwṣalu, btuwṣalu | taṣalin, btaṣalin |
| Imperfect | 3rd person pl. | m | yuwṣalu, b(y)uwṣalu | yaṣalu~yiṣalu, baṣalu |
| Imperfect | 3rd person pl. | f | yuwṣalu, b(y)uwṣalu | yaṣalin~yiṣalin, baṣalin |

===== Verbs IIw/y =====
The vowel of the short base of the perfect usually has the same quality as the vowel of the imperfect: gām~ygūm~gumt and gām~ygīm~gimt. An exception is šāf~yšūf~šuft. Verbs with yCāC imperfects usually have CiCt perfects.

===== Verbs IIIw/y =====
In the perfect, both CaCa and CiCi are found.

==== Form IV ====
Form IV is not productive in the sedentary dialects of Amman or Karak. A conservative feature of the sedentary Balqāwi-Hōrani group is the preservation of Form IV, which is productive in three uses:

- to create transitive verbs from nouns and adjectives:
  - bʿad—yibʿid “to go away” (from bʿīd “far”)
- to create “weather verbs”:
  - štat—tišti “to rain”
- to derive causative verbs from intransitive verbs with stem CvCvC:
  - gʿad—yigʿid “to wake sth. up” (from gaʿad—yugʿud “to sit down”)

=== Negation ===
Qdar is the infinitive form of the verb can. Baqdar means I can, I can't is Baqdareş, adding an eş or ış to the end of a verb makes it negative; if the word ends in a vowel then a ş should be enough.

An in-depth example of the negation: Baqdarelhomm figuratively means I can handle them, Baqdarelhommeş means I cannot handle them, the same statement meaning can be achieved by Baqdareş l'ıl homm

== Legal status ==
Jordanian Arabic is not regarded as the official language even though it has diverged significantly from Classic Arabic and Modern Standard Arabic (MSA). A large number of Jordanians, however, call their language "Arabic", while referring to the original Arabic language as Fusħa. This is common in many countries that speak languages or dialects derived from Arabic and can prove to be quite confusing. Whenever a book is published, it is usually published in English, French, or in MSA and not in Levantine.

== Writing systems ==
=== General remarks ===
There are many ways of representing Levantine Arabic in writing. The most common is the scholastic Jordanian Latin alphabet (JLA) system which uses many accents to distinguish between the sounds (this system is used within this article). Other Levantine countries, however, use their own alphabets and transliterations, making cross-border communication inconvenient.

=== Consonants ===
There are some phonemes of the Jordanian language that are easily pronounced by English speakers; others are completely foreign to English, making these sounds difficult to pronounce.

| Arabic consonant | JLA | IPA | Explanation |
|---|---|---|---|
| ب | b | [b] | As English ⟨b⟩. |
| ت | t | [t] | As English ⟨t⟩ in still (without the English aspiration). |
| ث | ṯ | [θ] | As English ⟨th⟩ in thief. It is rare, mostly in words borrowed from MSA. |
| ج | j | [dʒ] | As English ⟨j⟩, jam or ⟨s⟩ in vision (depending on accent and individual speaker's preference). |
| ح | ḥ | [ħ] | Somewhat like English ⟨h⟩, but deeper in the throat. |
| خ | ẖ | [x] | As German ⟨ch⟩ in Bach. |
| د | d | [d] | As English ⟨d⟩. |
| ذ | ḏ | [ð] | As English ⟨th⟩ in this. It is rare, mostly in words borrowed from MSA. |
| ر | ṛ | [ɾˤ] | Simultaneous pronunciation of ⟨r⟩ and a weak ayn below. |
| ر | r | [ɾ] | As is Scottish, Italian or Spanish. |
| ز | z | [z] | As English ⟨z⟩. |
| س | s | [s] | As English ⟨s⟩. |
| ش | š | [ʃ] | As English ⟨sh⟩. |
| ص | ṣ | [sˤ] | Simultaneous pronunciation of ⟨s⟩ and a weak ayn below. |
| ض | ḍ | [dˤ] | Simultaneous pronunciation of ⟨d⟩ and a weak ayn below. |
| ط | ṭ | [tˤ] | Simultaneous pronunciation of unaspirated ⟨t⟩ and a weak ayn below. |
| ظ | ẓ | [zˤ] | Simultaneous pronunciation of ⟨z⟩ and a weak ayn below. |
| ع | ʿ | [ʕ] | This is the ayn. It is pronounced as ḥ but with vibrating larynx. |
| غ | ġ | [ɣ] | As in ⟨g⟩ of Spanish pagar. |
| ف | f | [f] | As English ⟨f⟩. |
| ق | q | [q] | Similar to English ⟨k⟩, but pronounced further back in the mouth, at the uvula. It is rare, mostly in words borrowed from MSA apart from the dialect of Ma'daba or that of the Hauran Druzes. |
| ك | k | [k] | As English ⟨k⟩ in skill (without the English aspiration). |
| ل | l | [l] | As English ⟨l⟩ |
| م | m | [m] | As English ⟨m⟩. |
| ن | n | [n] | As English ⟨n⟩. |
| ه | h | [h] | As English ⟨h⟩. |
| و | w | [w] | As English ⟨w⟩. |
| ي | y | [j] | As English ⟨y⟩ in yellow. |

=== Vowels ===
Contrasting with the rich consonant inventory, Jordanian Arabic has much fewer vowels than English. Yet, as in English, vowel duration is relevant (compare /i/ in bin and bean).

| JLA | IPA | Explanation |
|---|---|---|
| a | [a] or [ɑ] | As English hut or hot (the latter linked to the presence of ṣ, ḍ, ṭ, ẓ, ẖ, ʿ, ḥ or ṛ). |
| ā | [aː] or [ɑː] | The previous one but longer (you hear [ɑː] in father). Amman is [ʕɑm'ma:n]. |
| i | [i] | As in English hit. |
| ī | [iː] | As in English heat. |
| u | [u] | As in English put. |
| ū | [uː] | As in English fool. |
| e | [e] | French été. |
| ē | [eː] | As in English pear, or slightly more closed. |
| o | [o] | As in French côté. |
| ō | [oː] | As French (faune) or German (Sohn). |

== Influences ==
Social factors shape lexical choices in Jordanian Arabic, such as terms for fruits and vegetables. In Amman, studies report that older men and speakers with less formal education more often use idiomatic forms, whereas neutral terms are more frequent in other groups. Local sociolinguistic work treats these patterns as correlations between vocabulary choice and variables such as age and education.

=== External Influences ===
Modern Standard Arabic (MSA) is spoken in formal TV programs, and in Modern Standard Arabic classes, as well as to quote poetry and historical phrases. It is also the language used to write and read in formal situations if English is not being used. However, MSA is not spoken during regular conversations. MSA is taught in most schools and a large number of Jordanian citizens are proficient in reading and writing formal Arabic. However, foreigners residing in Jordan who learn the Levantine language generally find it difficult to comprehend formal MSA, particularly if they did not attend a school that teaches it.

Other influences include English, French, Turkish, and Persian. Many loan words from these languages can be found in the Jordanian dialects, particularly English. However, students also have the option of learning French in schools. Currently, there is a small society of French speakers called Francophone and it is quite notable in the country. The language is also spoken by people who are interested in the cultural and commercial features of France.

== See also ==
- English-based creole language
- Jordan Academy of Arabic
