= Demographics of Iraq =

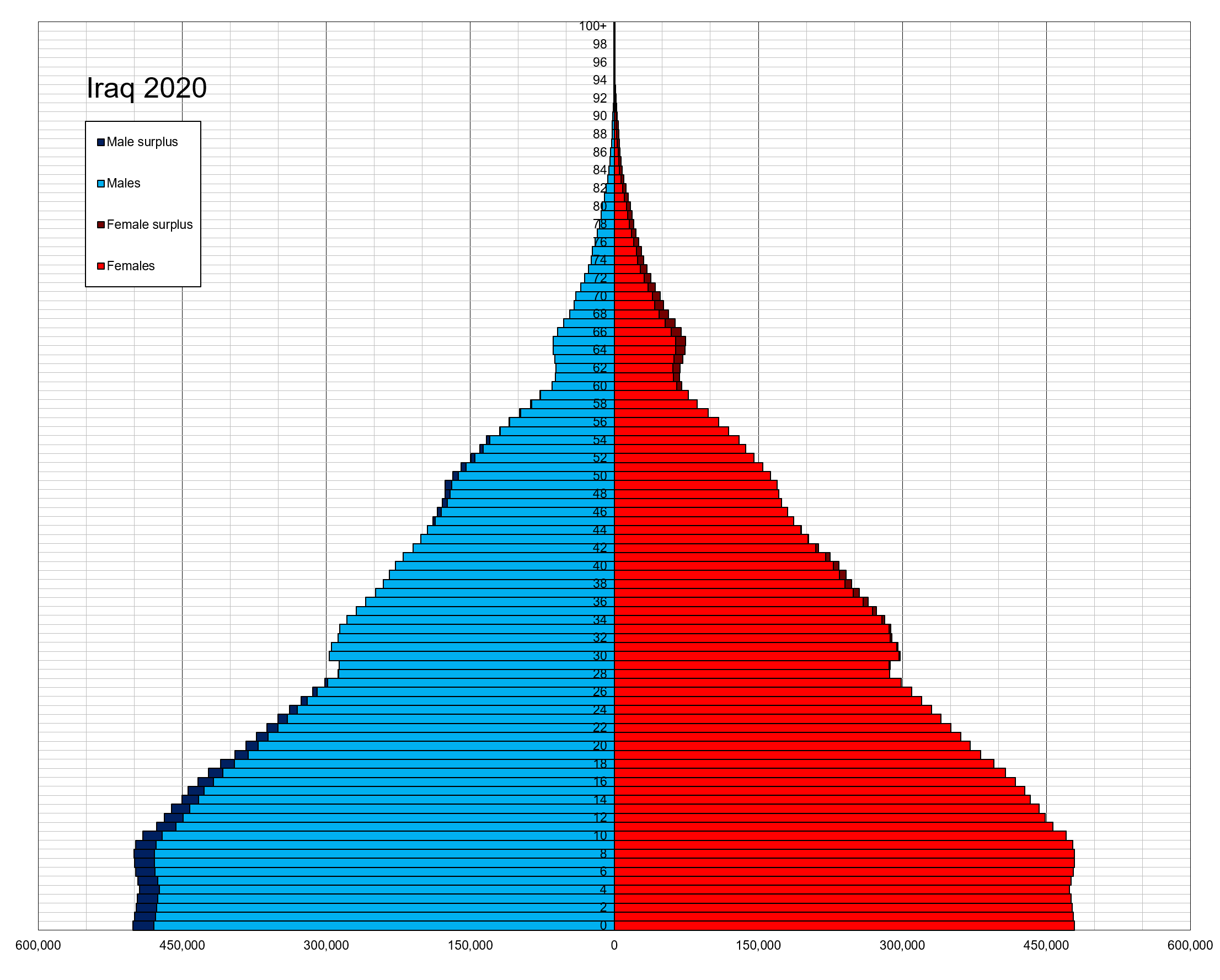
- Population pyramid of Iraq in 2020
- Population: 46,118,793 (2024)
- Growth rate: 2% (2022 est.)
- Birth rate: 34.23 births/1,000 population (2023 est.)
- Death rate: 3.9 deaths/1,000 population (2022 est.)
- Life expectancy: 73.18 years
  - male: 71.3 years
  - female: 75.15 years
- Fertility rate: 3.22 children born/woman (2024)
- Infant mortality: 19.62 deaths/1,000 live births
- Net migration rate: -0.83 migrant(s)/1,000 population (2022 est.)
- Immigrant share: 0.8% (2024)

Age structure
- 0–14 years: ▼35.90% (2024)
- 15–64 years: ▲60.44% (2024)
- 65 and over: ▲3.66% (2024)

Sex ratio
- Total: 1.01 male(s)/female (2022 est.)
- At birth: 1.05 male(s)/female
- Under 15: 1.04 male(s)/female
- 65 and over: 0.65 male(s)/female

Nationality
- Nationality: Iraqi
- Major ethnic: Arabs
- Minor ethnic: Kurds; Yazidis; Shabaks (Note: The ethnic origin of the Shabaks is uncertain and disputed, although they were largely considered Kurds by scholars.); Feyli Kurds; Other Kurds; Turks; Armenians; Afro-Arabs; Assyrians; Doms; Iraq-Iranians

Language
- Official: Arabic and Kurdish
- Spoken: Languages of Iraq

Historical population of Iraq

The Iraqi people (Arabic: العراقيون; Kurdish: گه‌لی عێراق) are people originating from the country of Iraq.

Iraqi Arabs are the largest ethnic group in Iraq, followed by Iraqi Kurds, then Iraqi Turkmen as the third largest ethnic group in the country. A minority of indigenous ethnic Assyrians also continue to exist in the country. Studies indicate that Mesopotamian Arabs, who make up the overwhelming majority of Iraq's population, are genetically distinct from other Arab populations in the Arabs of the Arabian peninsula.

The most spoken languages are Mesopotamian Arabic, Kurdish, Assyrian Syriac and Iraqi Turkmen dialects. The percentages of the different ethno-religious groups of Iraq vary from source to source due to the lack of recent official data.

After several postponements, the latest national census was held on 20 and 21 November 2024, with a total number of 120,000 field researchers who executed the census in all governorates on the set date. The detailed results, announced on 24 February 2025, showed that the Iraqi population had risen to 46,118,793, with 101 Male for every 100 Female. Named the ‘General Population and Housing Census’, it did not include a questionnaire on ethnicity, and was specifically designed to provide official data for developmental and welfare purposes.

== Population ==
Historical population
Year	Pop.	±% p.a.
0	1,000,000	—
500	1,005,000	+0.00%
1000	2,000,000	+0.14%
1500	1,000,000	−0.14%
1700	1,000,000	+0.00%
1800	1,000,000	+0.00%
1901	2,470,000	+0.90%
1955	6,502,657	+1.81%
1960	7,289,760	+2.31%
1965	8,375,790	+2.82%
1970	9,917,983	+3.44%
1975	11,684,590	+3.33%
1980	13,653,354	+3.16%
1985	15,555,800	+2.64%
1990	17,419,113	+2.29%
1995	20,149,338	+2.95%
2000	23,497,585	+3.12%
2005	26,922,284	+2.76%
2010	29,741,976	+2.01%
2015	35,572,261	+3.64%
2020	40,222,493	+2.49%
2024	46,118,793	+3.48%
Sources: before 1955: after 1955:

=== Structure of the population ===
Structure of the population

Structure of the population (17.10.1997) (Official)

Age group	Male	Female	Total	%
Total	10,987,252	11,058,992	22,046,244	100
0–4	1,907,322	1,862,248	3,769,570	17.10
5–9	1,688,130	1,627,076	3,315,206	15.04
10–14	1,421,683	1,363,313	2,784,996	12.63
15–19	1,290,386	1,243,525	2,533,911	11.49
20–24	1,016,867	1,025,804	2,042,671	9.27
25–29	847,383	872,810	1,720,193	7.80
30–34	679,211	708,439	1,387,650	6.29
35–39	412,940	484,993	897,933	4.07
40–44	428,413	453,425	881,838	4.00
45–49	326,666	349,381	676,047	3.07
50–54	263,237	255,955	519,192	2.36
55–59	214,561	208,597	423,158	1.92
60–64	134,527	156,316	290,843	1.32
65–69	123,136	146,658	269,794	1.22
70–74	81,818	110,811	192,629	0.87
75–79	54,984	68,775	123,759	0.56
80-84	38,137	45,719	83,856	0.38
85+	31,951	46,389	78,340	0.36
Unknown	25,900	28,758	54,658	0.25
Age group	Male	Female	Total	Percent
0–14	5,017,135	4,852,637	9,869,772	44.77
15–64	5,614,191	5,759,245	11,373,436	51.59
65+	330,026	418,352	748,378	3.39

Population Estimates by Sex and Age Group (01.VII.2020):

Age group	Male	Female	Total	%
Total	20 135 407	19 719 025	39 854 432	100
0–4	3 001 938	2 845 630	5 847 568	14.67
5–9	2 801 593	2 637 323	5 438 915	13.65
10–14	2 503 802	2 337 380	4 841 183	12.15
15–19	2 196 837	2 075 647	4 272 484	10.72
20–24	1 918 965	1 770 996	3 689 961	9.26
25–29	1 505 098	1 463 422	2 968 520	7.45
30–34	1 317 918	1 356 230	2 674 148	6.71
35–39	1 123 350	1 184 338	2 307 688	5.79
40–44	1 059 298	1 073 442	2 132 741	5.35
45–49	782 854	806 097	1 588 951	3.99
50–54	461 586	574 816	1 036 401	2.60
55–59	524 741	549 131	1 073 872	2.69
60–64	361 381	394 984	756 365	1.90
65-69	237 890	247 820	485 710	1.22
70-74	155 203	156 175	311 378	0.78
75-79	81 749	98 501	180 250	0.45
80+	101 202	147 093	248 296	0.62
Age group	Male	Female	Total	Percent
0–14	8 307 333	7 820 333	16 127 666	40.47
15–64	11 252 030	11 249 103	22 501 133	56.46
65+	576 044	649 589	1 225 633	3.08

== Vital statistics ==
=== UN estimates (based on UN WPP Revision 2024) ===
Year	Live births per year	Deaths per year	Natural change	CBR^{1}	CDR^{1}	NC^{1}	IMR^{1}	Total fertility rate	Life expectancy (years)
1950	259,000	142,000	117,000	45.7	25.1	20.6	222.0	6.20	38.98
1951	270,000	137,000	133,000	46.7	23.8	23.0	210.2	6.40	40.65
1952	293,000	136,000	157,000	49.4	23.0	26.4	199.1	6.84	42.20
1953	297,000	134,000	163,000	48.8	22.0	26.8	188.5	6.84	43.71
1954	297,000	130,000	167,000	47.6	20.8	26.7	178.5	6.76	45.21
1955	267,000	123,000	144,000	41.7	19.2	22.5	169.0	6.00	46.58
1956	271,000	117,000	154,000	41.4	17.8	23.6	160.1	6.00	47.88
1957	220,000	107,000	113,000	32.9	16.0	16.9	151.6	4.80	49.21
1958	224,000	101,000	123,000	32.9	14.8	18.1	143.7	4.80	50.41
1959	252,000	101,000	151,000	36.4	14.6	21.8	136.3	5.30	51.03
1960	257,000	98,000	159,000	36.3	13.9	22.4	129.4	5.30	52.62
1961	289,000	100,000	189,000	39.7	13.8	26.0	123.1	5.80	53.41
1962	352,000	105,000	247,000	47.1	14.0	33.0	117.2	6.87	54.33
1963	363,000	109,000	254,000	46.9	14.0	32.8	111.8	6.90	54.95
1964	373,000	110,000	263,000	46.7	13.8	32.9	107.4	6.93	55.63
1965	384,000	109,000	275,000	46.4	13.2	33.2	102.1	6.95	56.62
1966	395,000	109,000	286,000	46.2	12.8	33.4	97.7	6.97	57.35
1967	408,000	108,000	299,000	46.1	12.2	33.8	93.5	7.00	58.37
1968	422,000	110,000	312,000	46.1	12.0	34.1	89.9	7.05	58.78
1969	438,000	110,000	328,000	46.2	11.6	34.6	86.0	7.10	59.32
1970	450,000	110,000	340,000	45.8	11.2	34.6	82.6	7.08	60.19
1971	461,000	109,000	352,000	45.4	10.7	34.7	79.0	7.06	60.91
1972	471,000	110,000	362,000	44.8	10.4	34.4	76.0	7.01	61.39
1973	481,000	109,000	372,000	44.3	10.0	34.2	73.0	6.96	62.03
1974	492,000	117,000	375,000	43.7	10.4	33.4	70.4	6.93	60.90
1975	500,000	116,000	384,000	43.0	10.0	33.0	67.7	6.88	61.46
1976	508,000	108,000	400,000	42.3	9.0	33.3	64.6	6.81	63.72
1977	516,000	108,000	408,000	41.6	8.7	32.9	62.1	6.75	64.23
1978	525,000	110,000	416,000	41.0	8.5	32.4	59.8	6.69	64.40
1979	536,000	110,000	426,000	40.4	8.3	32.1	57.7	6.63	64.79
1980	546,000	128,000	418,000	40.0	9.4	30.6	55.7	6.57	61.50
1981	560,000	143,000	417,000	39.8	10.1	29.6	53.8	6.51	59.33
1982	573,000	143,000	429,000	39.5	9.9	29.6	52.1	6.45	59.73
1983	586,000	144,000	442,000	39.4	9.7	29.7	50.5	6.39	60.06
1984	607,000	147,000	460,000	39.5	9.6	29.9	49.1	6.33	60.22
1985	620,000	148,000	472,000	39.1	9.3	29.7	47.7	6.25	60.68
1986	626,000	149,000	477,000	38.8	9.2	29.6	46.4	6.18	60.87
1987	642,000	151,000	491,000	38.5	9.0	29.5	45.3	6.10	61.18
1988	662,000	184,000	477,000	38.8	10.8	28.0	49.2	6.02	57.47
1989	683,000	187,000	495,000	39.1	10.7	28.4	53.3	5.94	58.24
1990	713,606	195,036	518,570	40.6	11.1	29.5	52.2	5.93	57.59
1991	709,928	159,782	550,146	40.0	9.0	31.0	46.2	5.82	61.34
1992	722,490	130,586	591,904	39.5	7.1	32.4	41.1	5.72	65.34
1993	740,741	134,050	606,691	38.6	7.0	31.6	40.3	5.61	65.31
1994	777,798	143,447	634,351	38.6	7.1	31.5	39.7	5.49	65.03
1995	791,944	148,967	642,977	38.0	6.6	31.4	39.1	5.36	64.76
1996	806,382	153,509	652,873	37.5	7.1	30.4	38.4	5.25	64.62
1997	828,117	160,529	667,588	37.3	7.2	30.1	37.9	5.19	64.24
1998	846,632	162,481	684,151	37.0	7.1	29.9	36.9	5.11	64.40
1999	867,442	165,274	702,168	36.7	7.0	29.7	36.3	5.03	64.53
2000	881,887	166,114	740,000	36.1	6.8	29.3	35.6	4.92	64.86
2001	895,715	165,992	729,723	35.5	6.5	29.0	34.9	4.80	65.29
2002	904,796	165,371	739,425	34.8	6.4	28.4	34.2	4.67	65.72
2003	925,338	179,174	746,164	34.5	6.7	27.8	33.6	4.53	64.83
2004	947,136	185,575	761,561	34.3	6.7	27.6	32.9	4.45	64.63
2005	964,267	187,649	776,618	33.9	6.7	27.2	32.3	4.45	64.90
2006	1,000,546	203,198	797,348	35.0	7.1	27.9	31.6	4.46	64.03
2007	979,591	195,477	784,114	34.5	6.9	27.6	30.8	4.40	64.43
2008	974,582	172,477	802,105	33.6	6.0	27.6	30.1	4.37	66.47
2009	1,019,814	164,730	855,084	33.9	5.5	28.4	29.3	4.38	67.83
2010	1,074,309	167,937	906,372	34.6	5.4	29.2	28.6	4.46	68.09
2011	1,141,502	170,419	971,083	35.5	5.3	30.2	27.7	4.59	68.44
2012	1,172,290	172,325	999,965	34.8	5.1	29.7	26.9	4.54	68.83
2013	1,204,531	178,486	1,026,045	34.1	5.1	29.0	26.2	4.44	69.05
2014	1,218,190	177,446	1,040,744	33.3	4.9	28.4	25.2	4.31	69.68
2015	1,185,490	177,919	1,007,571	31.6	4.7	26.6	26.9	4.08	69.98
2016	1,146,998	200,060	946,938	29.8	5.2	24.6	23.7	3.84	68.68
2017	1,113,403	188,913	929,490	28.3	4.8	23.5	23.0	3.64	69.79
2018	1,113,895	175,615	938,280	27.7	4.4	23.3	22.4	3.55	71.12
2019	1,122,563	179,603	942,960	27.3	4.4	22.9	21.8	3.48	71.25
2020	1,130,421	210,459	919,962	26.8	5.0	21.8	21.0	3.42	69.65
2021	1,139,167	197,242	941,925	26.4	4.6	21.8	20.3	3.36	70.70
2022	1,145,989	183,525	962,464	26.0	4.2	21.8	19.7	3.29	72.04
2023	1,159,682	186,266	973,416	25.7	4.1	21.6	19.0	3.25	72.32
2024	1,177,772	191,811	985,961	25.6	4.2	21.4	18.7	3.22	72.42
2025	1,187,570	197,210	990,360	25.3	4.2	21.1	18.3	3.17	72.53
^{1} CBR = crude birth rate (per 1,000); CDR = crude death rate (per 1,000); NC = natural change (per 1,000); IMR = infant mortality rate per 1,000 births

View source data.
View source data.
View source data.
View source data.

=== Total fertility rate ===
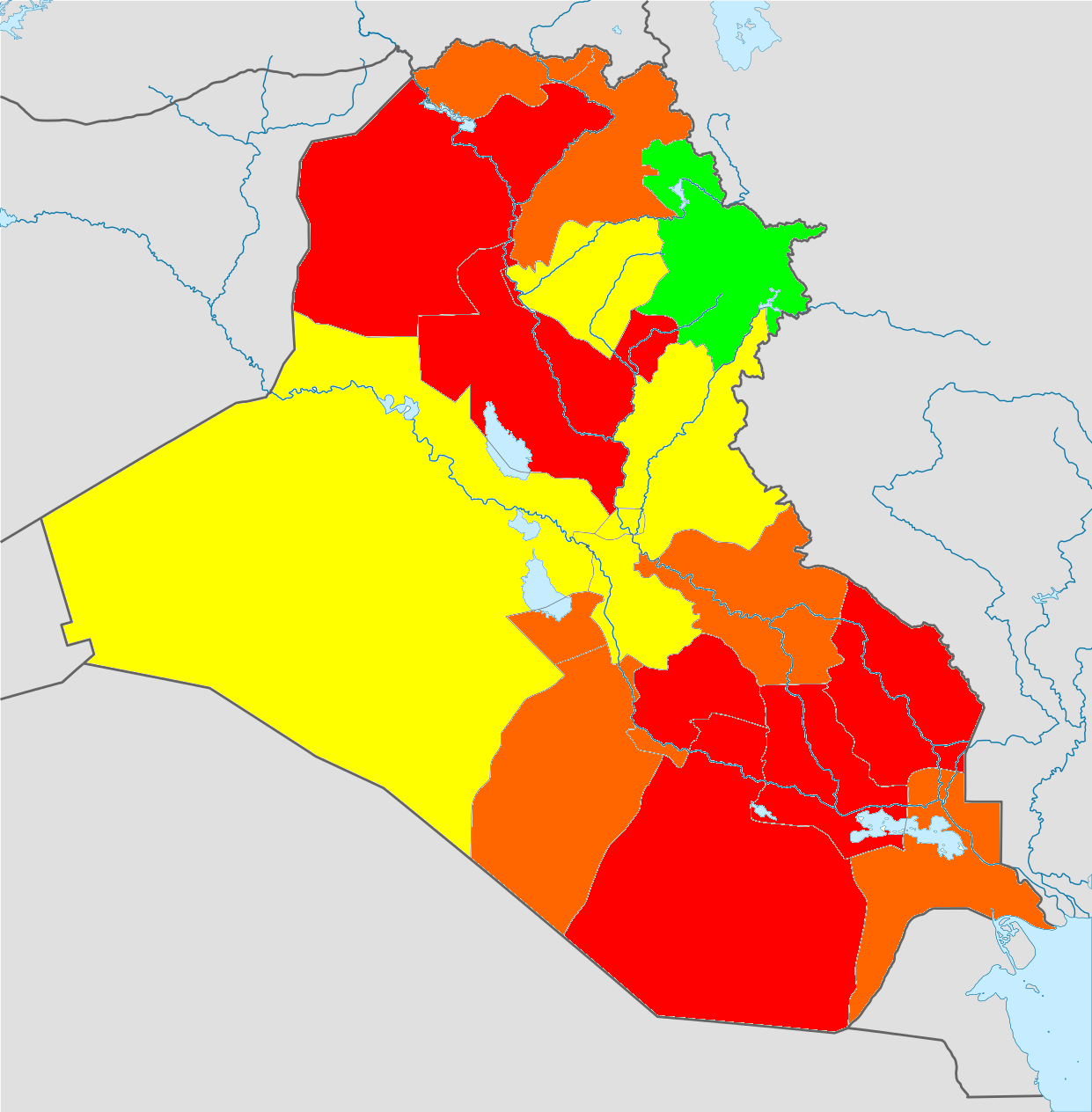
Iraq fertility rate by region (2006) 5–6 4–5 3–4 2–3

Age groups	1997	2006
15–19	56.2	68
20–24	210	187
25–29	276.2	221
30–34	257.9	188
35–39	196.5	136
40–44	101.4	56
45–49	31	9
Total	1,128.2	865
TFR		4.3

Years	1925	1926	1927	1928	1929	1930	1931	1932	1933	1934
Total Fertility Rate in Iraq	7.13	7.17	7.21	7.25	7.29	7.33	7.37	7.41	7.45	7.48

Years	1935	1936	1937	1938	1939	1940	1941	1942	1943	1944
Total Fertility Rate in Iraq	7.52	7.56	7.60	7.64	7.68	7.72	7.76	7.80	7.84	7.88

Years	1945	1946	1947	1948	1949
Total Fertility Rate in Iraq	7.91	7.95	7.99	8.03	8.07

=== Life expectancy at birth ===
Average life expectancy at birth of the total population.

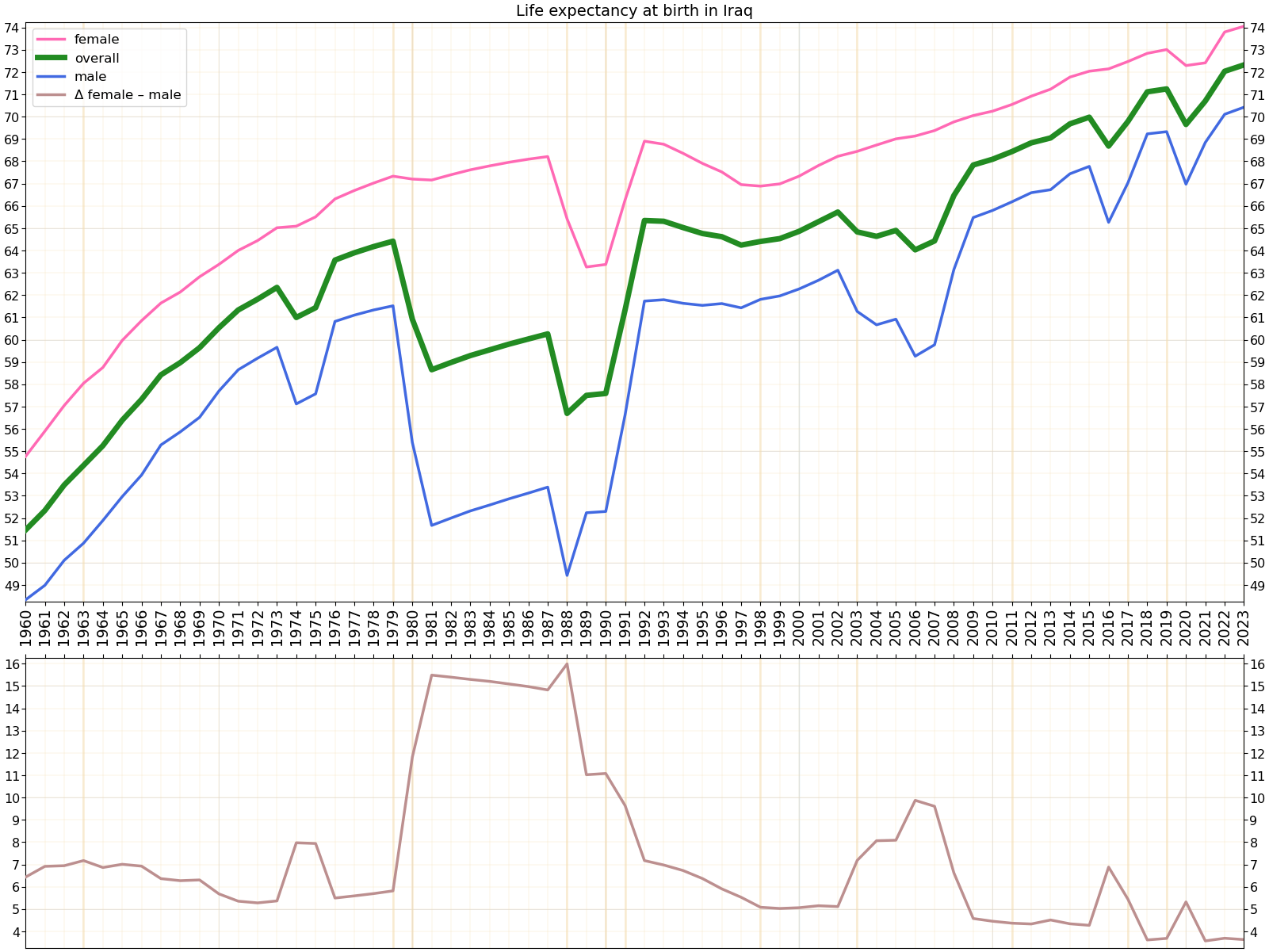
Life expectancy at birth in Iraq

Period	Life expectancy in Years	Period	Life expectancy in Years
1950–1955	37.9	1985–1990	64.3
1955–1960	44.9	1990–1995	67.4
1960–1965	50.9	1995–2000	69.1
1965–1970	56.4	2000–2005	68.9
1970–1975	59.5	2005–2010	68.0
1975–1980	61.7	2010–2015	69.2
1980–1985	59.0		

== Ethnicity ==
Sunni Arabs Shiite Arabs Sunni Kurds Assyrians Yazidis Turkmen

Iraq's dominant ethnic group is Arabs, who account for more than three-quarters of the population.

According to the CIA World Factbook, citing a 1987 Iraqi government estimate, the population of Iraq is formed of 75-80% Arabs (including Marsh Arabs) followed by 15-20% Kurds and other minorities form 5% of the country's population, including the Turkmen, Kaka'i, Bedouins, Roma, Assyrians, Circassians, Mandaeans, and Persians.

However, the International Crisis Group points out that figures from the 1987 census, as well as the 1967, 1977, and 1997 censuses, "are all considered highly problematic, due to suspicions of regime manipulation" because Iraqi citizens were only allowed to indicate belonging to either the Arab or Kurdish ethnic groups; consequently, this skewed the number of other ethnic minorities, such as Iraq's third largest ethnic group – the Turkmen.

== Languages ==
Arabic and Kurdish are the two official languages of Iraq. Arabic is taught across all schools in Iraq, however in the north the Kurdish language is the most spoken. Eastern Aramaic languages, such as Syriac and Mandaic are spoken, as well as the Iraqi Turkmen language, and various other indigenous languages.

Kurdish, including several dialects, is the second largest language and has regional language status in the north of the country. Aramaic, in antiquity spoken throughout the whole country, is now only spoken by the Assyrian minority, in distinct dialects that differ from church affiliation and geographic origin. The Iraqi Turkmen dialect is spoken in parts of northern Iraq, numerous languages of the Caucasus are also spoken by minorities, notably the Chechen community.

== Religions ==
Religion in Iraq (2015 CIA estimate)
1. Shia Islam (61.0%)
2. Sunni Islam (34.0%)
3. Christianity (2.00%)
4. Other (3.00%)

The CIA World Factbook estimated in 2015 that between 95-98% of Iraqis followed Islam, with 61-64% being Shia and 29-34% being Sunni. Christianity accounted for 2%, and the rest (1-4%) practiced Yazidism, Mandaeism, and other religions.

While there has been voluntary relocation of many Christian families to northern Iraq, recent reporting indicates that the overall Christian population may have dropped by as much as 50 percent since the fall of Saddam Hussein in 2003, with many fleeing to Syria, Jordan, and Lebanon (2010 estimate). The percentage of Christians has fallen from 6% in 1991 or 1.5 million to about one third of this. Estimates say there are 500,000 Christians in Iraq.

Nearly all Iraqi Kurds identify as Sunni Muslims. A 2014 survey in Iraq concluded that "98% of Kurds in Iraq identified themselves as Sunnis and only 2% identified as Shias". The religious differences between Sunni Arabs and Sunni Kurds are small. While 98 percent of Shia Arabs believe that visiting the shrines of saints is acceptable, 71 percent of Sunni Arabs did and 59 percent of Sunni Kurds support this practice. About 94 percent of the population in Iraqi Kurdistan is Muslim.

== See also ==
- Armenians in Iraq
- Assyrians in Iraq
- Homelessness in Iraq
- Iraqi diaspora
- Youth in Iraq
