= Youth in Iraq =

Youth in Iraq are individuals that are between 15–24 years old. Youth represent 19.6% of Iraq’s population of 32 million. The median age is 21 years. The population continues to rise, as mass migration known as the Iraq diaspora has occurred.

The youth population have experienced poor health from the effects of both malnutrition and poverty. Securing employment is difficult for youth in Iraq. The youth dependency ratio is 70.6%.

The minimum age one can be considered an adult after committing a crime is seven.

== Leisure ==
The National Youth Orchestra of Iraq was formed due to the interest of youth pianist, Zuhal Sultan. Since forming in 2008, they have performed in numerous countries and hold auditions via YouTube annually.

Dambala is a game that resembles the popular Western-style game, bingo. Players can earn cash and prizes in Dambala. The popularity of the game has resulted in many Iraqi youth's participation. Dambala is played in clubs and bars.

Western-style is being emulated by youth in Iraq. For both male and female youth, tattoos are gaining popularity as well as the clothing that is worn.

== Employment ==
Iraqi youth unemployment rates have increased. There are over 1 million unemployed Iraqi youth. Those who graduate with a university education are finding it difficult to find employment. 80% of recent graduates are listed as unemployed.

== Health ==
The Iraqi Diaspora has resulted in the decline of health infrastructures. Malnutrition is an issue for Iraqi youth. There are over 1.5 million suffering from its effects. 3.5 million individuals are living in poverty. A decrease in the infant mortality rate has been seen over the past few decades. This rate dropped from over 40 infant deaths in 2010 per 1000 births, to under 35 per 1000 births in the 1980s. The mortality rates for Iraqi children under the age of 5 has also decreased. This rate dropped from 60 deaths per 1000 in the 1980s, to under 40 by 2010.

In the Kurdistan region there is a high rate of suicide among female youth. Female youth in arranged marriages having higher rates of incidence. Many of them commit suicide as a sacrifice for their strong beliefs. This is called self-immolation. In the city of Sindar, the rate of suicides have doubled in comparison with the rate of suicide in the US.
