= Khuzestani Arabic =

Mesopotamian Arabic dialect spoken in Iran

- Native to: Iran
- Region: Khuzestan province
- Ethnicity: Khuzestani Arabs
- Native speakers: 570,000 (2021)
- Language family: Afro-Asiatic: Semitic; West Semitic; Central Semitic; Arabic; Iraqi Arabic; Gilit Iraqi Arabic; Khuzestani Arabic
- Writing system: Arabic alphabet

Language codes
- ISO 639-3: acm
- Glottolog: None
- IETF: acm-IR

Khuzestani Arabic is a dialect of South Mesopotamian Arabic (SMA or "Gələt Arabic") spoken by the Iranian Arabs in Khuzestan Province of Iran. While it is a variety of SMA, it has many similarities with Gulf Arabic in neighbouring Kuwait. It has subsequently had a long history of contact with the Persian language, leading to several changes. The main changes are in word order, noun–noun and noun–adjective attribution constructions, definiteness marking, complement clauses, and discourse markers and connectors.

Khuzestani Arabic is only used in informal situations. It is not taught in school even as an optional course, although Modern Standard Arabic is taught at a basic level for religious purposes. Almost all Khuzestani Arabic speakers are bilingual in Iranian Persian, which is the official language of Iran. Khuzestani Arabic speakers are shifting to Persian; if the existing shift continues into the next generations, according to Bahrani & Gavami in Journal of the International Phonetic Association, the dialect will be nearly extinct shortly.

It is not clear how many speakers of Khuzestani Arabic there are.

The province of Khuzestan has about 4.5 million inhabitants. [...] Although no official numbers exist, it has been estimated that around 2 to 3 million people of the inhabitants of Khuzestan are Arabs (Matras and Shabibi 2007: 137; Gazsi 2011: 1020). Yet it is hard to determine what percentage of this population uses Arabic actively. Estimates in the 1960s of the Arabic-speaking population in Iran ranged from 200,000 to 650,000 (Oberling 1986: 216). Today, the usage and cross-generational transfer of Arabic have lowered in recent decades, especially among the wealthier social classes and in multilingual cities and neighbourhoods. In rural areas and neighborhoods (e.g. Shadegan and Hoveyzeh), where the majority of the residents are Arabs, this tendency is not felt.

== Distribution ==
Khuzestani Arabic is spoken in Ahvaz, Hoveyzeh, Bostan, Susangerd, Shush, Abadan, Khorramshahr, Shadegan, Hamidiyeh, Karun, and Bawi.

== Contact and lexis ==
Khuzestani Arabic is in contact with Bakhtiari Lurish, Persian, and other varieties of SMA. Although the lexis of the dialect is primarily composed of Arabic words, it also has Persian, English, French and Turkish loanwords. In the northern and eastern cities of Khuzestan, Luri is spoken in addition to Persian, and the Arabic of the Kamari Arabs of this region is "remarkably influenced" by Luri. In cities in Khuzestan such as Abadan, some of the new generations, especially women, often mainly speak Persian. Some Khuzestani Arabic speakers furthermore only converse in Persian at home with their children.

== Phonology ==
=== Vowels ===
Khuzestani Arabic vowel phonemes
	Front	Central	Back
Close	i iː		u uː
Mid	e eː	ə	o oː
Open		a aː	

- Sounds /a, aː/ may be heard as back [ɑ, ɑː] when in the context of emphatic or dorsal consonant sounds.

=== Consonants ===
Even in the most formal of conventions, pronunciation depends upon a speaker's background. Nevertheless, the number and phonetic character of most of the 28 consonants has a broad degree of regularity among Arabic-speaking regions. Arabic is particularly rich in uvular, pharyngeal, and pharyngealized ("emphatic") sounds. The emphatic coronals (/sˤ/, /dˤ/, /tˤ/, and /ðˤ/) cause assimilation of emphasis to adjacent non-emphatic coronal consonants. The phonemes /p/ ⟨پ⟩ and /v/ ⟨ڤ⟩ (not used by all speakers) are only occasionally considered to be part of the phonemic inventory; they exist only in foreign words and they can be pronounced as /b/ ⟨ب⟩ and /f/ ⟨ف⟩, respectively, depending on the speaker.

Khuzestani Arabic consonant phonemes
		Labial	Dental	Denti-alveolar		Palatal	Velar	Uvular	Pharyngeal	Glottal
		Labial	Dental	plain	emphatic	Palatal	Velar	Uvular	Pharyngeal	Glottal
Nasal		m		n						
Stop	voiceless	(p)		t	tˤ		k			ʔ
Stop	voiced	b		d	dˤ		g			
Fricative	voiceless	f	θ	s	sˤ	ʃ	x ~ χ		ħ	h
Fricative	voiced	(v)	ð	z	ðˤ		ɣ ~ ʁ		ʕ	
Affricate	voiceless					tʃ				
Affricate	voiced					d͡ʒ				
Tap				ɾ	ɾˤ					
Approximant				l	(ɫ)	j	w			

Phonetic notes:

- /p/ and /v/ occur mostly in borrowings from Persian, and may be assimilated to /b/ or /f/ in some speakers.
- /ɡ/ is pronunciation of /q/ in Khuzestani Arabic and the rest of southern Mesopotamian dialects.
- The gemination of the flap /ɾ/ results in a trill [r].

== Grammar ==
=== Pronouns ===
Independent personal pronouns
		Singular	Plural
1st person		ʔāna	ʔəḥna / ḥənna (Note: Only recorded among the semi-nomadic speakers at the outskirts of Ahvaz)
2nd person	m	ʔənta	ʔəntəm (North) / ʔəntam (Tustam) / ʔəntu (South)
2nd person	f	ʔənti	ʔəntan
3rd person	m	həwa / ʔəhwa / ʔəhəwa	ʔəhma / ʔəhəma / həmma
3rd person	f	hīya / ʔəhya / ʔəhəya	ʔəhna / hənna

Pronominal suffixes
		Singular		Plural
		After consonants	After vowels	Plural
1st person		-i (Note: After nouns and prepositions), -ni (Note: After verbs)	-y, -ya, -ni	-na
2nd person	m	-ak	-k	-kəm
2nd person	f	-əč	-č	-čan
3rd person	m	-a	-´	-həm
3rd person	f	-ha		-hən

When attached to nouns, pronominal suffixes are used to express possession. When added to finite verbs or active participles, pronominal suffixes are used to express direct objects.
