= Gilit =

Gilit may refer to:

- Gilgit, locally known as Gilit, a city in northern Pakistan
- Gilit Arabic, a variety of the Mesopotamian Arabic language
