= Anatolian Arabic =

Arabic varieties of Southeastern Turkey

- لهجات عربية أناضولية
- Native to: Turkey
- Ethnicity: Arabs in Turkey (including Mhallami)
- Native speakers: 160,000 (2025)
- Language family: Afro-Asiatic: Semitic; West Semitic; Central Semitic; Arabic; Mesopotamian; Qeltu; Anatolian Arabic
- Writing system: Arabic alphabet

Language codes
- ISO 639-3: –
- Glottolog: anat1256
- ELP: Siirti Arabic
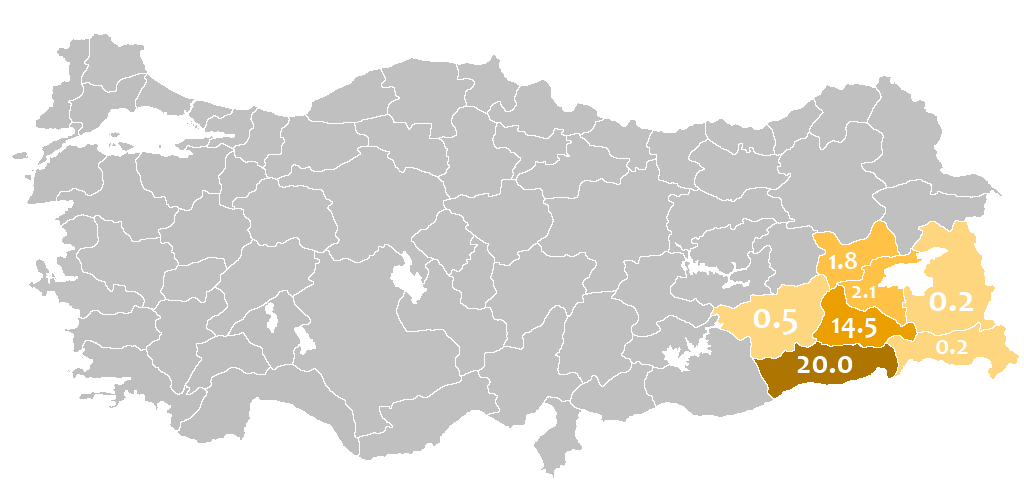
- Map of Anatolian Arabic speaking provinces in Turkey as of 1965 census

Anatolian Arabic is a grouping of North Mesopotamian Arabic varieties spoken in Turkey. It encompasses several qeltu varieties of Arabic spoken in the provinces of Mardin, Siirt, Batman, Diyarbakır, Muş and Bitlis. Since most Jews and Christians have left the area, the vast majority of remaining speakers are Sunni Muslims and the bulk live in the Mardin area. Most speakers also know Turkish and many, especially those from mixed Kurdish-Arab villages, speak Kurdish. Especially in isolated areas, the language has been significantly influenced by Turkish, Kurdish, and historically Turoyo (the latter in the western dialect area).

The Mardin dialect is mutually intelligible with the Moslawi dialect of Iraq. However, the peripheral varieties in the Siirt, Muş, and Batman provinces near Lake Van are quite divergent.

Mesopotamian Arabic is spoken to the west by about 100,000 people in Şanlıurfa Province, while North Levantine Arabic has over a million speakers in the Adana, Hatay, and Mersin provinces. Anatolian Arabic is not mutually intelligible with the Urfa dialect.

== Phonology ==
=== Consonants ===
		Labial	Interdental		Dental/Alveolar		Palatal	Velar	Uvular	Pharyngeal	Glottal
		Labial	plain	emph.	plain	emph.	Palatal	Velar	Uvular	Pharyngeal	Glottal
Nasal		m			n						
Stop/ Affricate	voiceless	p			t	tˤ	t͡ʃ	k	q		ʔ
Stop/ Affricate	voiced	b			d		d͡ʒ	ɡ			
Fricative	voiceless	f	θ		s	sˤ	ʃ	x		ħ	h
Fricative	voiced	(v)	ð	ðˤ	z		(ʒ)	ɣ		ʕ	
Trill					r	rˤ					
Approximant					l	ɫ	j	w			

- The phonemes /v, ʒ/ only occur in the Mardin dialect.

=== Vowels ===
	Front	Central	Back
Close	i iː		u uː
Mid	eː	ə	oː
Open		a aː	

- /i, u/ may also be lowered as [ɪ, ʊ] when preceding a velar to glottal consonant.
