= Gilit Mesopotamian Arabic =

Arabic dialect

- Gilit Arabic
- اللهجة العراقية
- Native to: Iraq, Iran, Syria
- Speakers: 20 million (2021–2024)
- Language family: Afro-Asiatic: Semitic; West Semitic; Central Semitic; Arabic; Mesopotamian Arabic; Gilit Mesopotamian Arabic
- Dialects: Baghdadi Arabic; Shawi Arabic; Khuzestani Arabic; South Mesopotamian Arabic
- Writing system: Arabic alphabet

Language codes
- ISO 639-3: acm Mesopotamian Arabic
- Glottolog: meso1252

Gilit Mesopotamian Arabic, also known as Iraqi Arabic, Mesopotamian Gelet Arabic, or simply Mesopotamian Arabic is one of the two main varieties of Mesopotamian Arabic, together with North Mesopotamian Arabic.

== Relationship to North Mesopotamian ==
Mesopotamian Arabic has two major varieties: Gelet and Qeltu, also called "North Mesopotamian". Their names derive from the form of the word for "I said" in each variety. Gelet Arabic is a Bedouin variety spoken by Muslims (both sedentary and non-sedentary) in central and Lower Mesopotamia and by nomads in the rest of Iraq. Qeltu Arabic is an urban dialect spoken by non-Muslims in this same region, including Baghdad, and by the sedentary population (both Muslims and non-Muslims) in Upper Mesopotamia. Non-Muslims include Christians, Yazidis, and Jews, until most Iraqi Jews were exiled from Iraq in the 1940s–1950s. Geographically, the gelet–qeltu classification roughly corresponds to respectively Upper Mesopotamia and Lower Mesopotamia. The isogloss is between the Tigris and Euphrates, around Fallujah and Samarra.

During the Siege of Baghdad in 1258, the Mongol Empire killed all Muslims in the city and environs. However, sedentary Christians and Jews were spared, and Upper Mesopotamia was untouched. In Lower Mesopotamia, sedentary Muslims were gradually replaced by Bedouins from the countryside. This explains the current dialect distribution: in the south, inhabitants speak Bedouin varieties closer to Gulf Arabic; they are descended from Bedouin varieties of the Arabian Peninsula. The exception is urban non-Muslims, who continue to speak pre-1258 Qeltu dialects. In contrast, in the north, Qeltu Arabic is widely spoken by Muslims and non-Muslims alike.

Gelet/qeltu verb contrasts
s-stem	Bedouin/gelet	Sedentary/qeltu
1st sing.	ḏạrab-t	fataḥ-tu
2nd m. sing.	ḏạrab-t	fataḥ-t
2nd f. sing.	tišṛab-īn	tǝšrab-īn
2nd pl.	tišṛab-ūn	tǝšrab-ūn
3rd pl.	yišṛab-ūn	yǝšrab-ūn

== Dialects ==
Gelet dialects include:

- Gilit Mesopotamian Arabic
  - Northwestern Mesopotamian group
    - Shāwi dialects (including Urfa and Raqqah)
    - Rural dialects of northern and central Iraq.
  - Central Iraqi Group
    - Baghdadi Arabic
    - The surrounding area around Baghdad
  - Southern Iraqi and Khuzestani Arabic group
    - Urban dialects
    - Rural dialects
    - South Mesopotamian Arabic of the Marsh Arabs of the Mesopotamian Marshes

Baghdadi Arabic is Iraq's de facto national vernacular, as about half of the population speaks it as a mother tongue, and most other Iraqis understand it. It is spreading to northern cities as well. Other Arabic speakers cannot easily understand Moslawi and Baghdadi. The Iraqi dialect is notable for its diversity and its general closeness to Modern Standard Arabic (MSA), with Iraqis often capable of pronouncing classical Arabic with proper phonetics.
