= Bedouin Arabic =

Dialects of the Arabic language

- Language family: Afro-Asiatic: Semitic; West Semitic; Central Semitic; Arabic; Bedouin Arabic

Language codes
- ISO 639-3: –

Bedouin Arabic refers to a typological group of Arabic dialects historically linked to Bedouin tribes, that has spread among both nomadic and sedentary groups across the Arab World. The group of dialects originate from Arabian tribes in Najd and the Hejaz that have spread since the 10th century until modern day. Bedouin dialects vary by region and tribe, but they typically share a set of features which distinguish them from sedentary-type dialects in each region.

The term can be ambiguous, as it can refer to dialects of nomadic Bedouins, dialects of Bedouin-descended populations, or sedentary dialects that have been influenced by Bedouin dialects.

== Background ==
The similarities between Bedouin dialects are due to their historical contact with one another, due to rapid population movements that quickly erase linguistic diversity.

== Features ==
- Voiced pronunciation of qāf, in contrast to voiceless pronunciations, such as /q/ in many sedentary dialects, or /ʔ/ in Egyptian Arabic, Levantine Arabic, and the Maltese language. This is the only innovation that can be said to unite all Bedouin dialects. In most cases, this voiced pronunciation is a voiced velar plosive, but it is sometimes affricated in some Eastern Bedouin dialects to /d͡z/ in Najd, or to /d͡ʒ/ in Eastern Arabia, Mesopotamia, and Shawi dialects.
- Preserving interdental consonants Ṯāʾ /θ/, Ḏāl /ð/, and Ẓāʾ /ðˤ/. Like in most other dialects, Ḍād and Ẓāʾ have merged, so Ḍād is also pronounced as /ðˤ/. Many sedentary dialects preserve them as well, while many pronounce them as /t/, /d/, and /dˤ/, respectively. In some sedentary dialects in Egypt and the Levant, interdental consonants in loans from Standard Arabic are often pronounced as /s/, /z/, and /zˤ/.
- Preserving nunation as suffix -in, for example: bintin zēnah.
- Distinguishing masculine and feminine plural pronouns -hum and -hun.
- Internal passive verb forms, such as kutib (passive voice of katab). In sedentary dialects, prefixes such as in- (inkatab) and it- (itkatab) are used.

=== Eastern Bedouin features ===
- Verbal suffix -ūn to mark plural subjects.
- Palatalization of /g/ (qāf) and /k/ occurring before front vowels, with two realizations:
  - /g/ → /d͡ʒ/ and /k/ → /tʃ/ in Gulf, Mesopotamian, and Shawi dialects.
  - /g/ → /d͡z/ and /k/ → /ts/ in the Najdi dialect group.

== Examples ==
Eastern dialects:

- Najdi Arabic, spoken in Arabia, the Syrian Desert, and Upper Mesopotamia. As defined by Ingham, this dialect group includes bedouin dialects across a wide area from Najran to the south, Syria to the North, Hejaz, and Eastern Arabia.
- Shawi Arabic, spoken by sheep-rearing tribes living between the Tigris and the Euphrates, but also in northern Jordan, Palestine, western Syria, and Lebanon.
- Northwest Arabian Arabic, a variety of Arabic spoken by Bedouins mostly in northwestern Saudi Arabia, southern Jordan, southern Israel, and eastern Egypt.
- Omani bedouin dialects.
- Gulf Arabic, spoken by sedentary populations on the Persian Gulf coast, many of whom descend from Bedouin tribes.
- The Gelet dialects of Mesopotamian Arabic, spoken in the majority of Iraq.

Western dialects:

- Hilalian dialects, a group of Maghrebi dialects that include most bedouin dialects in the Maghreb.
- Hassaniya Arabic, the variety of Arabic originally spoken by the Beni Hassān Bedouin tribes.
- Libyan Arabic or Sulaimitian Arabic, a variety of Arabic spoken in Libya and neighboring countries.
- Saharan Arabic, a variety of Arabic spoken in Algeria.
- Chadian Arabic, the variety of Arabic spoken in Nigeria, Chad, and Sudan.

== See also ==
- Bedouin, a predominantly desert-dwelling Arabian ethnic group
- Varieties of Arabic, regional and other varieties of the Arabic language
