= Qeltu Mesopotamian Arabic =

Arabic dialect of Iraq, Syria, and Turkey

- Moslawi Arabic; Mardelli Arabic; North Mesopotamian Arabic; Syro-Mesopotamian Arabic
- لهجة موصلية
- Native to: Iraq, Syria, Turkey
- Speakers: 11 million (2024–2025)
- Language family: Afro-Asiatic: Semitic; West Semitic; Central Semitic; Arabic; Mesopotamian; Qeltu Mesopotamian Arabic
- Dialects: Anatolian; Cypriot; Jewish
- Writing system: Arabic alphabet

Language codes
- ISO 639-3: ayp
- Glottolog: nort3142
- ELP: North Mesopotamian Arabic
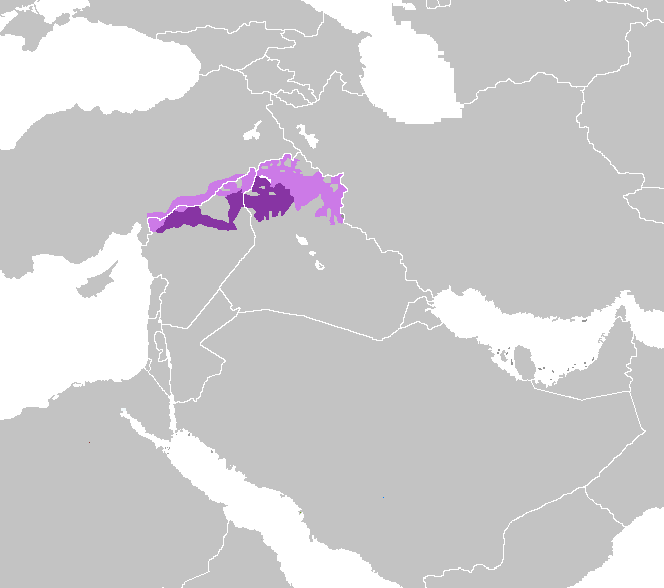

Qeltu Mesopotamian Arabic, also known as Moslawi (meaning 'of Mosul'), Mardelli (meaning 'of Mardin'), North Mesopotamian Arabic, or Syro-Mesopotamian Arabic, is one of the two main varieties of Mesopotamian Arabic, together with Gilit Mesopotamian Arabic.

== Relationship to Gilit Mesopotamian ==
Mesopotamian Arabic has two major varieties: Gelet and Qeltu, also called "North Mesopotamian". Their names derive from the form of the word for "I said" in each variety. Gelet Arabic is a Bedouin variety spoken by Muslims (both sedentary and non-sedentary) in central and Lower Mesopotamia and by nomads in the rest of Iraq. Qeltu Arabic is an urban dialect spoken by non-Muslims in this same region, including Baghdad, and by the sedentary population (both Muslims and non-Muslims) in Upper Mesopotamia. Non-Muslims include Christians, Yazidis, and Jews, until most Iraqi Jews were exiled from Iraq in the 1940s–1950s. Geographically, the gelet–qeltu classification roughly corresponds to respectively Upper Mesopotamia and Lower Mesopotamia. The isogloss is between the Tigris and Euphrates, around Fallujah and Samarra.

During the Siege of Baghdad in 1258, the Mongol Empire killed all Muslims in the city and environs. However, sedentary Christians and Jews were spared, and Upper Mesopotamia was untouched. In Lower Mesopotamia, sedentary Muslims were gradually replaced by Bedouins from the countryside. This explains the current dialect distribution: in the south, inhabitants speak Bedouin varieties closer to Gulf Arabic; they are descended from Bedouin varieties of the Arabian Peninsula. The exception is urban non-Muslims, who continue to speak pre-1258 Qeltu dialects. In contrast, in the north, Qeltu Arabic is widely spoken by Muslims and non-Muslims alike.

Gelet/qeltu verb contrasts
s-stem	Bedouin/gelet	Sedentary/qeltu
1st sing.	ḏạrab-t	fataḥ-tu
2nd m. sing.	ḏạrab-t	fataḥ-t
2nd f. sing.	tišṛab-īn	tǝšrab-īn
2nd pl.	tišṛab-ūn	tǝšrab-ūn
3rd pl.	yišṛab-ūn	yǝšrab-ūn

== Dialects ==
Qeltu dialects include:

- North Mesopotamian Arabic
  - Anatolian Arabic
    - Mardin dialects: Mardin and surrounding villages, Mhallami, Qamishli, Nusaybin (Christians), Cizre (Jews)
    - Siirt dialects
    - Diyarbakır dialects: Diyarbakır (Christians and Jews), Diyarbakır villages (Christians), Siverek, Çermik and Urfa (Jews)
    - Kozluk–Sason–Muş dialects
  - Tigris Qeltu
    - Moslawi: Mosul and surrounding villages (Bahzani, Bashiqa, Ain Sifni)
    - Moslawi group (Jews only)
      - Northern Moslawi: Sandur, Akre, Erbil, Šoš
      - Southern Moslawi: Kirkuk, Tuz Khurmatu, Khanaqin
    - Tikrit and surroundings
    - Baghdad Jewish Arabic and Baghdadi Christian Arabic
  - Euphrates Qeltu
    - Khawetna (Syria, Iraq, Turkey)
    - Deir ez-Zor
    - Anah and Abu Kamal
    - Hit, Iraq

Baghdadi Arabic is Iraq's de facto national vernacular, as about half of the population speaks it as a mother tongue, and most other Iraqis understand it. It is spreading to northern cities as well. Other Arabic speakers cannot easily understand Moslawi and Baghdadi. The Iraqi dialect is notable for its diversity and its general closeness to Modern Standard Arabic (MSA), with Iraqis often capable of pronouncing classical Arabic with proper phonetics.

The peripheral Anatolian Arabic varieties in Siirt, Muş and Batman are quite divergent.

Cypriot Arabic shares a number of common features with North Mesopotamian Arabic, and one of its pre-Cypriot medieval antecedents has been deduced as belonging to this dialect area. However, its current form is a hybrid of different varieties and languages, including Levantine Arabic and Greek.

== Aramaic substrate ==
Mesopotamian Arabic, especially North Mesopotamian Arabic, has a significant Eastern Aramaic substrate, and through it also has significant influences from the ancient languages of Mesopotamia, Sumerian and Akkadian. Eastern Aramaic dialects flourished and became the lingua franca throughout Mesopotamia when it was Achaemenid Assyria . Mesopotamian Arabic also was influenced by New Persian, Mongolic, Turkic (including Ottoman Turkish), and Koine Greek.
