= Northwest Arabian Arabic =

Variety of the Arabic language

- Levantine Bedawi Arabic; Eastern Egyptian Bedawi Arabic
- Native to: Egypt, Jordan, Israel, Saudi Arabia, Palestine, Syria
- Native speakers: 3.0 million (2021–2023)
- Language family: Afro-Asiatic: Semitic; West Semitic; Central Semitic; Arabic; Northwest Arabian Arabic
- Writing system: Arabic alphabet

Language codes
- ISO 639-3: avl
- Glottolog: east2690

Northwest Arabian Arabic (also called Levantine Bedawi Arabic or Eastern Egyptian Bedawi Arabic) is a proposed subfamily of Arabic encompassing the traditional Bedouin dialects of the Sinai Peninsula and Egyptian Eastern Desert, the Negev, Gaza Strip, southern Jordan, and the northwestern corner of Saudi Arabia.

Maʿāzah dialect represents the southwestern extremity of Northwest Arabian on the Egyptian mainland.

In Saudi Arabia, the dialects of the eastern coast of the Gulf of Aqaba, the Hisma, and the Harrat al-Riha belong to the Northwest Arabian type, but the dialect of the Bili to the south is not closely related.

== Classification ==
The Northwest Arabian Arabic dialects display several innovations from Proto-Arabic:

1. The voiced reflex of *q ([g])
2. The gaháwah syndrome: insertion of /a/ after X in (C)aXC(V) sequences where X is /h/, /ʿ/, /ḥ/, /ġ/, or /ḫ/, e.g. gahwa(h) > gaháwa(h) "coffee", baġl > baġal "mule".
3. The definite article al- and the relative pronoun alli are stressable as an integral part of the word, e.g. álwalad, áljabal. The initial /a/ is stable enough to be preserved after -ī (-iy), which is dropped: f-albēt, rāʿ-álġanam.
4. A number of typical Bedouin lexical items (gōṭar "to go", sōlaf "to tell, narrate", ṭabb "to arrive", nišad ~ nišád "to ask").
5. Absence of tanwīn and its residues.
6. Absence of final /n/ in the imperfect, 2nd person feminine singular, 2nd person masculine plural, and 3rd person masculine plural.
7. The pronominal suffix of the 2nd person masculine plural is -ku (-kuw).
8. Stressed variants -ī and -nī of the pronominal suffix in the 1st person singular.
9. Plural comm. forms haḏalla, haḏallāk, etc.
10. Initial /a/ in Forms VII, VIII, and X in the perfect, and stressed when in stressable position.
11. Initial /a/ in a number of irregular nouns (amm, aḫt, aḫwan, adēn, afám).

== Varieties ==
Northwest Arabian Arabic can be divided into a western branch spoken in Sinai and the Negev, and an eastern branch spoken to the east of the Wadi Araba. Several dialects of the eastern branch, such as that of the Zalabiah and Zawaidih of Wadi Ramm, and that of the Bdul, have been argued to be closely related to the western branch.

Differences between western and eastern branches:
	Western branch	Eastern branch
b- imperfect	in regular use	does not occur in plain colloquial
analytic genitive	šuġl, šuġlah, šuġlīn, šuġlāt as genitive markers	
Form I imperfect performative	vowel harmony	generalized /a/
reflexes of *aw and *ay	partially monophthongized; monophthongs fluctuate with long phonemes /ō/ ~ /ū/, /ē/ ~/ī/.	well-established monophthongs /ō/ and /ē/
gahawa syndrome	gaháwa only	ghawa ~ gaháwa
I-w imperfect	yawṣal ~ yōṣal	yāṣal
3FSG object suffix	-ha/-hiy in Negev	-ha
3MSG object suffix	phonetically conditioned C-ih/-ah, C-u(h) in southern Sinai	C-ah
subject pronoun	iḥna, aḥna	ḥinna, iḥna
reflex of -ā(ʾ) in neutral environments	-iy	-a

== Phonology ==
=== Consonants ===
		Labial	Interdental		Dental/Alveolar		Palatal	Velar		Uvular	Pharyngeal	Glottal
		Labial	plain	emph.	plain	emph.	Palatal	plain	emph.	Uvular	Pharyngeal	Glottal
Nasal		m			n							
Plosive	voiceless				t	tˤ		k	kˤ	(q)		(ʔ)
Plosive	voiced	b			d			ɡ				
Affricate							d͡ʒ					
Fricative	voiceless	f	θ		s	sˤ	ʃ	x			ħ	h
Fricative	voiced		ð	ðˤ	z	(zˤ)	(ʒ)	ɣ			ʕ	
Trill					r	(rˤ)						
Approximant					l	lˤ	j	w				

- Phonemes in parentheses occur either marginally or across different dialects
- [ʒ] can be heard as an allophone of /d͡ʒ/.
- /rˤ/ is mostly heard in the Hindiy and Ṭuwara dialects

=== Vowels ===
Vowels occur in both long and short positions:

	Front	Back
Close	i iː	u uː
Mid	eː	oː
Open	a aː	

Vowels are recognized as allophones in the following positions:

Phoneme/Sound	Allophone	Notes
i [i]	[ɪ]	in lax position
u [u]	[ʊ]	in lax position
u [u]	[o]	when preceding emphatic sounds
a [a]	[ɐ]	in lax position
a [a]	[ɑ]	when preceding or following emphatics
eː [eː]	[ɛː]	when following emphatic or back fricatives
oː [oː]	[ɔː]	when preceding velar consonants
aː [aː]	[ɑː]	in velarized environments
aː [aː]	[ɐː]	when following pharyngeal consonants
aː [aː]	[ɛː ~ æː]	in neutral position in the Tarabin dialect

=== Imala ===
==== Word-internal imala of */-ā-/ ====
Some varieties of Negev Arabic are characterized by word-internal imala of *-ā- to /ē/ in patterns where /i/ historically occurred in an adjacent syllable. It does not occur when one of the adjacent consonants is emphatic or a back consonant. Some of the patterns where it is found include the following:

- Reflexes of *CāCiC: šēyib “elder, old man”, ḥēmiy “hot”, gēyil “having said”, bēkir “morning”, wēḥid “one”, ṯēniy “second”
- Reflexes of *CiCāC(ah): srēǧ “oil lamp”, ktēbih “writing”
- Reflexes of *miCCāC(ah): miftēḥ “key”, miknēsih “broom”
- Broken plurals *CaCāCiC: gibēyil “tribes”, šinētiy “bags”
- Imperfect *yuCāCiC: ysēwiy “it equals”, yǧēwib “he replies”

Similar raising is found in the Bdul dialect of Jordan: minǣsif “mansaf (pl.)”, hǣḏi “this (f.)”, ḏ̣aygǣt “narrow (pl.)”, iblǣdna “our land”.

==== Word-final imala of */-ā(ʾ)/ ====
Some of the western dialects of Northwest Arabian Arabic (Central Sinai and Negev in particular) are characterized by an Imala of Old Arabic word-final *-ā(ʾ) to /iy/ in certain patterns of nouns and adjectives. Emphatics seem to block the shift. The following examples are from Negev Arabic:

- Reflexes of *CiCāʾ, *CuCāʾ: štiy “rainy season”, ḥḏiy “footwear”, dʿiy “cursing”, ndiy “call”, zniy “adultery”, ġniy “song”, ʿšiy “evening prayer”, dliy “pails (pl.)”, mliy “full (pl.)”, rwiy “well-watered (pl.)”, miy “water”
- Reflexes of *CiCā, *CuCā: lḥiy “beards”, griy “hospitality”, hdiy “right guidance”, hniy “here”
- Reflexes of *CiCCā(ʾ), *CuCCā(ʾ): yimniy “right side”, yisriy “left side”, sifliy “nether millstone”, ʿilyiy “upper millstone”, miʿziy “goats”, ḥimmiy “fever”, ḥinniy “henna”, juwwiy “inside”, ḥiffiy “barefoot (pl.)”, mūsiy “Moses”, ʿīsiy “Jesus”
- Feminine adjective *CaCCāʾ: sawdíy “black”, ṭaršíy “deaf”, tarjíy “sloping downwards (ground)”, šahabíy “grey, light blue”, ḥawwíy “salt-and-pepper, black with white spots (animal)”, zargíy “blue”, ʿawjíy “crooked”, šadfíy “left-handed, left”, ḥawlíy “cross-eyed”, safʿíy “black-eared (goat)”
- Broken plural *CaCCā: nōmiy “asleep (pl.)”, mōtiy ~ máwtiy “dead (pl.)”

In the dialects of southern Sinai, word-final imala typically results in /iʾ/. Some examples are íštiʾ “winter”, ǧiʾ “he came”, ḏiʾ “this, these”, tižibhiʾ “you get it”, ifṭarniʾ “we had breakfast”. In some, but not all groups, /a/ in a previous syllable blocks this imala. Like the dialects of central Sinai and Negev, the imala of feminine adjectives of color and defect on the pattern CaCCāʾ results in stressed /íy/: sōdíy “black; bad”.

== Characteristics ==
The following are some archaic features retained from Proto-Arabic:

1. Gender distinction in the 2nd and 3rd person plural pronouns, pronominal suffixes, and finite verbal forms.
2. Productivity of Form IV (aC_{1}C_{2}aC_{3}, yiC_{1}C_{2}iC_{3}).
3. The initial /a/ in the definite article al- and the relative pronoun alli.
4. Frequent and productive use of diminutives (glayyil "a little", ḫbayz "bread").
5. Absence of affricated variants of /g/ (< */q/) and /k/.
6. The use of the locative preposition fi (fiy).
7. The invariable pronominal suffix -ki of the 2nd person feminine singular.

== See also ==
- Varieties of Arabic
- Peninsular Arabic

== Sources ==
- Gordon, Raymond G.. Jr., ed. (2005), "Bedawi Arabic", Ethnologue: Languages of the World (15th ed.), Dallas: Summer Institute of Linguistics
- Blanc, Haim (1970). "The Arabic Dialect of the Negev Bedouins". Proceedings of the Israel Academy of Sciences and Humanities. 4 (7): 112–150. OCLC 963504406.
- Piamenta, Moshe (1996). "More on the Arabic Dialect of the Negev Bedouins". Quaderni di Studi Arabi. 14: 123–136. JSTOR 25802794.
- De Jong, Rudolf Erik (2000). A Grammar of the Bedouin Dialects of the Northern Sinai Littoral. doi:10.1163/9789004491229. ISBN 978-90-04-49122-9.
- de Jong, Rudolf (2011). A Grammar of the Bedouin Dialects of Central and Southern Sinai. doi:10.1163/ej.9789004201019.i-440. ISBN 978-90-04-20101-9.
- Judith Rosenhouse. 1984. The Bedouin Arabic Dialects: General Problems and Close Analysis of North Israel Bedouin Dialects. Wiesbaden: Harrassowitz.
