= Homelessness in Iraq =

The causes of homelessness in Iraq are diverse. Forced evictions of internally displaced persons from public land and buildings have contributed heavily to the homeless population of the country. In 2007, the United Nations estimated that 16% of the Iraqi population have fled their homes because of the conflict, and half of these have left the country, leaving some of the remaining in the country homeless, though some rent housing or stay with family and friends. In 2014, the estimated homeless population in Iraq sat at roughly 2,000,000 with 544 homeless individuals per 10,000 people.

As of 2025, one further factor in Iraq's homelessness rate is the country's housing crisis. The Iraqi Government estimates that it needs 200,000 new housing units annually and that there is a deficit exceeding 2,500,000 units. Ahmed Eid, an Economist interviewed by Shafaq News, claims financial resources that ought to be used to tackle this issue are poorly distributed and sometimes given away to groups affiliated with militia or politics. Eid states, "“In many cases, loans are misused for non-housing purposes, undermining their developmental intent.”
