= National Youth Orchestra of Iraq =

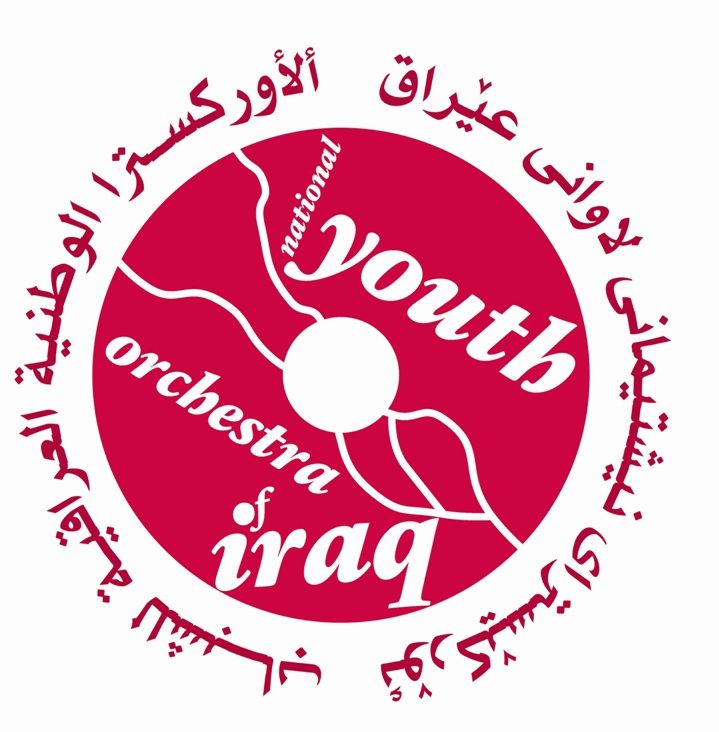
National Youth Orchestra of Iraq's logo and official colour for 2011

The National Youth Orchestra of Iraq (NYOI) is a youth orchestra comprising musicians from different parts of Iraq. The members are aged between 14 and 29 years. They are selected every autumn-winter through a process of online and video auditions.

== The National Youth Orchestra of Iraq ==
The National Youth Orchestra of Iraq is the brainchild of Zuhal Sultan at 17 years of age. She worked with Raw Television on their award-winning Battlefront series of Generation Y leaders during 2008/9 to create the orchestra.

In September 2008, Raw TV sent out a press release entitled "Iraqi Teen seeks Maestro for Youth Orchestra" to UK press, which Scottish Conductor, Paul MacAlindin, read and responded to. After choosing Paul as musical director, Zuhal brought in friend and fellow musician, Allegra Klein, Director of Musicians for Harmony in New York. Together, they worked online to set up the first summer course for 2009.

Auditions by YouTube were organised with players in Baghdad and the Kurdish Region of Iraq. Funding was secured from the Baghdad and Kurdish governments, as well as the British Council and Foreign and Commonwealth Office of Great Britain. The British Council, at that time directed by Tony Reilly, also became the operational partner in Iraq.

== Courses ==
The orchestra meets once a year in a two- week summer course. For the second year in a row, the course has been held in the Kurdish Region of Iraq. The course includes intensive training by European and American professional musicians, providing an opportunity for the talented musicians to receive group lessons as well as one to one as most of the members have had little tuition or have been self-taught. The course includes ice-breaking and bonding sessions between members and tutors.

== See also ==
- Official website run by German charitable association Förderverein Nationales Jugendorchester des Irak e.V. – "JOI"
- Iraqi National Symphony Orchestra
- Zuhal Sultan
- Musicians For Harmony
- List of youth orchestras
