= Baghdadi Arabic =

Variety of Mesopotamian Arabic spoken in Baghdad, Iraq

- اللهجة البغدادية
- Native to: Mesopotamia
- Region: Baghdad
- Language family: Afro-Asiatic: Semitic; West Semitic; Central Semitic; Arabic; Mesopotamian; Gilit; Baghdadi Arabic
- Writing system: Arabic alphabet

Language codes
- ISO 639-3: acm – Mesopotamian Arabic
- Glottolog: None
- IETF: acm-u-sd-iqbg

Baghdadi Arabic is the variety of Arabic spoken in Baghdad, the capital of Iraq. During the 20th century, Baghdadi Arabic has become the lingua franca of Iraq and the language of commerce and education. It is considered a subset of Gilit Mesopotamian Arabic.

== Phonology ==
=== Vowels ===
The vowel phoneme /eː/ (from standard Arabic /aj/) is usually realised as an opening diphthong, for most speakers only slightly diphthongised [ɪe̯], but for others a more noticeable [iɛ̯], such that, for instance, lēš ("why") will sound like liēš, much like a drawl in English. There is a vowel phoneme that evolved from the diphthong (/aw/) to resemble more of a long (/o:/) sound, as in words such as kaun ("universe") shifting to kōn. A schwa sound [ə] is mainly heard in unstressed and stressed open and closed syllables.

The Vowel Phonemes of Baghdadi Arabic
	Short		Long	
	Front	Back	Front	Back
Close	/ɪ/	/u/	/iː/	/uː/
Mid	/ə/	/u/	/eː/	/oː/
Open	/æ/		/aː/	

=== Consonants ===
Even in the most formal of conventions, pronunciation depends upon a speaker's background. Nevertheless, the number and phonetic character of most of the 28 consonants has a broad degree of regularity among Arabic-speaking regions. Arabic is rich in uvular, pharyngeal, and pharyngealized ("emphatic") sounds. The emphatic coronals (/sˤ/, /tˤ/, and /ðˤ/) cause assimilation of emphasis to adjacent non-emphatic coronal consonants. The phonemes /p/ ⟨پ⟩ and /v/ ⟨ڤ⟩ (not used by all speakers) are not considered to be part of the phonemic inventory, as they exist only in foreign words and they can be pronounced as /b/ ⟨ب⟩ and /f/ ⟨ف⟩ respectively depending on the speaker.

Baghdadi Arabic consonant phonemes
		Labial	Dental	Coronal		Palatal	Velar	Uvular	Pharyngeal	Glottal
		Labial	Dental	plain	emphatic	Palatal	Velar	Uvular	Pharyngeal	Glottal
Nasal		m		n						
Stop/Affricate	voiceless	(p)		t	tˤ	t͡ʃ	k	(q)		ʔ
Stop/Affricate	voiced	b		d	d͡ʒ		g			
Fricative	voiceless	f	θ	s ~ ɕ	sˤ	ʃ	x ~ χ		ħ ~ ʜ	h
Fricative	voiced	(v)	ð	z ~ ʑ	ðˤ		ɣ ~ ʁ		ʕ ~ ʢ	
Tap			r							
Approximant				l	ɫ	j	w			

Phonetic notes:

- /p/ and /v/ occur mostly in borrowings from Persian, and may be assimilated to /b/ or /f/ in some speakers.
- [q] is heard in borrowings of non-Arabic languages.
- /ɡ/ is the pronunciation of /q/ in Baghdad Arabic and the rest of southern Mesopotamian dialects.
- The gemination of the flap /ɾ/ results in a trill /r/.

== See also ==
- Baghdadi Judeo-Arabic
- North Mesopotamian Arabic

== Sources ==
- Kees Versteegh, et al. Encyclopedia of Arabic Language and Linguistics, BRILL, 2006.
- Abū-Haidar, Farīda (1991). Christian Arabic of Baghdad. Otto Harrassowitz Verlag. ISBN 9783447032094.
- Holes, Clive (2004). Modern Arabic : structures, functions, and varieties. Washington, D.C.: Georgetown University Press. ISBN 978-1-58901-022-2.
