= Zuhal Sultan =

Iraqi pianist and activist (born 1991)

- Born: 18 July 1991 (age 34); Baghdad, Iraq
- Occupations: Founder and Artistic Director of the National Youth Orchestra of Iraq

Zuhal Sultan (Arabic: زحل سلطان; born 1991 in Baghdad, Iraq) is an Iraqi pianist and activist. She founded the National Youth Orchestra of Iraq at the age of 17.

== Early life and music ==
Born in Baghdad, Iraq, in July 1991, Zuhal Sultan is the youngest of a scientific family of two boys and two girls. Both of her parents obtained their Ph.D. degrees in natural sciences from universities in the United Kingdom. She started piano studies at the age of six with the help of a private tutor, then she auditioned to join the Music and Ballet School of Baghdad at the age of 9. After the departure from Iraq of many artists and intellectuals as a result of the 2003 Iraq War, Zuhal was left without a piano teacher. She therefore taught herself, as well as the younger students in her piano class. Despite all these difficulties, Zuhal has performed concerts both at home and abroad, including Jordan, France, Switzerland and at the Wigmore Hall, and at the Royal Festival Hall in London as a member of the Leonard Bernstein Mass orchestra.

== Activism ==
Zuhal was chosen as a British Council Global Changemaker in 2008, and was then invited to become a peer facilitator for their 4th Global Youth Summit in 2009. She was involved with UNICEF and UNESCO in raising awareness through concerts, speeches and media interviews on Iraqi culture as well as Iraqi children's rights and education. Zuhal was a keynote speaker at FairSay's eCampaiging forum in 2009 held at Oxford University. She also served as a Global Youth Ambassador for the New York-based charity Musicians For Harmony.she also was the closest friend of Mr.Rekawt Omar Karim in Iraqi Kurdistan Halabja city. She has also participated at the World Economic Forum's Special Meeting on Economic Growth and Job Creation in the Arab World, held at the Dead Sea, Jordan, 21–23 October 2011.

== National Youth Orchestra of Iraq ==
In 2008, she was chosen by Channel 4 and Raw T.V. for their web-based programme Battlefront to campaign for establishing the first National Youth Orchestra of Iraq. Along with Scottish conductor Paul MacAlindin and Musicians For Harmony's artistic director Allegra Klein, she formed the orchestra with the help of the British Council and the then Deputy Prime Minister of Iraq Barham Salih, whom she contacted through Twitter. The orchestra's debut was in August 2009 in the Kurdish city Al Suleimanya. The orchestra then performed in the Kurdish city of Erbil in 2010. Planning is underway are for a follow-up academy in 2011.

== Recognition ==
Zuhal has received a great deal of attention in the American and European media, including stories in the Wall Street Journal, the Los Angeles Times, Symphony Magazine, Classical Music Magazine, International Piano Magazine, CNN Television, British Satellite News, and the Italian and French press.

Zuhal was named UNESCO's Young Artist for Intercultural Dialogue between the Arab and Western Worlds in a ceremony held in Spring of 2011 at UNESCO's headquarters in Paris.

In 2015 Zuhal was named the Euphrates Institute's Visionary of the Year. She gave a speaking tour across the US and did a number of interviews including NPR and St. Louis public radio.
