= Shawi Arabic =

Arabic dialect of Syro-Mesopotamian Bedouin

- Šāwi Arabic
- Language family: Afro-Asiatic: Semitic; West Semitic; Central Semitic; Arabic; Mesopotamian; Gilit; Shawi Arabic

Language codes
- ISO 639-3: –

Shawi or Šāwi Arabic is the Arabic dialect of the sheep-rearing Bedouins of Syro-Mesopotamia. The term Šāwi typically refers to the tribes living between the Tigris and the Euphrates, but many tribes are also found elsewhere, such as northern Jordan, Palestine, western Syria, and Lebanon. The dialect of the Arabs of Urfa also belongs to the Šāwi-Bedouin group.

== Classification ==
Cantineau (1936) was the first classification the dialects of the sheep breeders of northern Arabia. He was the first to coin the terminology ‘petit-nomades’ (sheep breeders) and ‘grand-nomades’ (camel breeders). The Shawi dialects typically represent the ‘petit-nomades’ type.

The hallmark of Shawi dialects is the affrication of Old Arabic */k/ and */ɡ/ (< */q/) in front environments into ⟨č⟩ /t͡ʃ/ and ⟨ǧ⟩ /d͡ʒ/, respectively, as opposed to the north Arabian camel-breeder varieties, which exhibit ⟨ć⟩ [t͡s] and ⟨ź⟩ [d͡z]. This feature is shared with Gulf Arabic dialects.

== History ==
Shawi tribes constitute the first recognized Bedouin migration wave from northern Arabia. Local traditions and some studies date their arrival to one millennium ago, although older migrations are likely for some clans.

== Phonology ==
=== Consonants ===
Consonants of the Antakya Bedouin dialect
		Labial	Interdental		Dental/Alveolar		Palatal	Velar	Uvular	Pharyngeal	Glottal
		Labial	plain	emph.	plain	emph.	Palatal	Velar	Uvular	Pharyngeal	Glottal
Nasal		m			n						
Stop	voiceless				t	tˤ	t͡ʃ	k			
Stop	voiced	b			d		d͡ʒ	ɡ			
Fricative	voiceless	f	θ		s	sˤ	ʃ	x		ħ	h
Fricative	voiced		ð	ðˤ	z			ɣ		ʕ	
Tap/Trill					ɾ ~ r						
Approximant					l		j	w			

Historical */q/ has become /ɡ/. Historical */k/ has become /t͡ʃ/ before front vowels and in the 2fs suffix, as in /abuːt͡ʃ/ 'your(f) father'; cf. /abuːk/ 'your(m) father'. In some dialects */q/ > /ɡ/ has become /d͡ʒ/ in the same environment. In many dialects /ɣ/ has an allophone [q] before a vowel, as in [qeːm] 'cloud'.

=== Vowels ===
The dialect of Urfa is typical of Shawi Arabic. A contrast between short /i/ and /u/ is 'very rare', and phonetic [i] vs [u] may be conditioned by the consonant, but in most words they correspond to Classical Arabic and minimal pairs are attested, such as nigra 'we read' vs nugra 'pit'. In Antioch, short /u/ only occurs in the vicinity of labial consonants and consonants from velar on back (including emphatic consonants). Diphthongs */ai/, */au/ are not preserved in any position.

Vowels of Antakya and Urfa Bedouin dialects
	Front	Central	Back
Close	i iː		(u) uː
Mid	eː		oː
Open		a aː	

In some dialects the short vowels may be reduced to two, with various realizations of the non-low vowel such as [ə].
