= Baghdadi Judeo-Arabic =

Arabic dialect spoken by Jews in Baghdad

- Judeo-Baghdadi Arabic
- haki mal yihud, el-haki malna
- Native to: Iraq
- Ethnicity: Jews in Baghdad
- Language family: Afro-Asiatic: Semitic; Central Semitic; Arabic; Mesopotamian; Qeltu; Judeo-Iraqi; Baghdadi Judeo-Arabic
- Writing system: Arabic alphabet Hebrew alphabet

Language codes
- ISO 639-3: –
- Glottolog: None
- IETF: yhd-u-sd-iqbg

A man speaking Baghdadi Judeo-Arabic.

Baghdadi Judeo-Arabic (Arabic: عربية يهودية بغدادية, עַרָבִיָּה יְהוּדִיַּה בַּגדָאדִיַּה) or autonym haki mal yihud (Jewish Speech) or el-haki malna (our speech) is the variety of Arabic spoken by the Jews of Baghdad and other towns of Lower Mesopotamia in Iraq. This dialect differs from the North Mesopotamian Arabic spoken by Jews in Upper Mesopotamian cities such as Mosul and Anah. Baghdadi and Northern Mesopotamian are subvarieties of Judeo-Iraqi Arabic.

As with most Judeo-Arabic communities, there are likely to be few, if any, speakers of the Judeo-Iraqi Arabic dialects who still reside within Iraq. Rather these dialects have been maintained or are facing critical endangerment within respective Judeo-Iraqi diasporas, namely those of Israel and the United States. In 2014, the film Farewell Baghdad (Arabic: مطير الحمام; Hebrew: מפריח היונים, lit. 'The Dove Flyer'), which is performed mostly in Jewish Baghdadi Arabic dialect, became the first film to be almost completely performed in Judeo-Iraqi Arabic.

The language is being taught at the Oxford School of Rare Jewish Languages by Dr Assaf Bar Moshe whose family emigrated to Israel from Iraq and who speaks it as his mother tongue. His textbook Baghdadi Judeo-Arabic, an introductory text is available as an open-source textbook.

Iraqi Jewish author Samantha Ellis wrote a book about the language, which is also her mother tongue, called Chopping Onions on my Heart in the UK and Always Carry Salt in the US, which was shortlisted for the Wingate Prize.

== Classification ==
Baghdad Jewish Arabic (and Baghdadi Christian Arabic) resemble North Mesopotamian Arabic, and more distantly Syrian Arabic, rather than the Baghdadi Arabic spoken by Baghdadi Muslims. Muslims speak a gilit dialect (from their pronunciation of the Arabic word for "I said") while the others are qeltu dialects. Another resemblance between Baghdad Jewish Arabic and North Mesopotamian Arabic is the pronunciation of ra as a uvular. This peculiarity goes back centuries: in medieval Iraqi Judaeo-Arabic manuscripts the letters ra and ghayn are frequently interchanged.

It is thought that the qeltu dialects represent the older Arabic dialect of Mesopotamia while the gilit dialect is of Bedouin origin. Another factor may be the northern origins of the Jewish community of Baghdad after 1258 (see below under History).

Like Northern Mesopotamian and Syrian Arabic, Jewish Baghdadi Arabic shows some signs of an Aramaic substrate. Violette Shamosh records that, at the Passover Seder, she could understand some of the passages in Aramaic but none of the passages in Hebrew.

== History ==
The Mongol invasion wiped out most of the inhabitants of Mesopotamia. Later, the original qeltu Baghdadi dialect became extinct as a result of massive Bedouin immigrations to Lower Mesopotamia and was replaced by the Bedouin influenced gilit dialect. The Jews of Baghdad are a largely indigenous population and they also preserve the pre-Mongol invasion dialect of Baghdad in its Jewish form, which is similar but a bit different from the general pre-Mongol Baghdadi dialect due to the linguistic influences of Hebrew and Judeo-Babylonian Aramaic, instead of the general Babylonian Aramaic that existed before the Islamic invasion.

As with other respective religious and ethnic communities coexisting in Baghdad, the Jewish community had spoken as well as written almost exclusively in their distinctive dialect, largely drawing their linguistic influences from Hebrew and Judeo-Aramaic languages as well as from languages such as Sumerian, Akkadian, Persian, and Turkic. Simultaneous fluency and literacy in the Arabic used by the dominant Muslim communities had also been commonplace.

With waves of persecution and thus emigration, the dialect has been carried to and until recently used within respective Judeo-Iraqi diaspora communities, spanning Bombay, Calcutta, Singapore, Hong Kong, Manchester and numerous other international urban hubs. After the mass emigration of Jews from Iraq to Israel between the 1940s and 1960s, Israel came to hold the single largest linguistic community of Judeo-Iraqi Arabic speakers. With successive generations being born and raised in Israel, it is mainly the older people who still actively or passively speak Judeo-Baghdadi and other forms of Judeo-Iraqi Arabic. Israelis of Iraqi descent in turn are largely unilingual Modern Hebrew speakers.

== Orthography ==
The Jews of Baghdad also have a written Judeo-Arabic that differs from the spoken language and uses Hebrew characters. There is a sizeable published religious literature in the language, including several Bible translations and the Qanūn an-nisā' (قانون النساء) of the hakham Yosef Hayyim.

The following method of describing the letters of the Hebrew alphabet was used by teachers in Baghdad until quite recently:

Letter	Description	
א	'ábu 'áġbaʿ ġūs	'alēf
א	has four heads	'alēf
ב	ġazūna	bē
ב	a niche	bē
ג	'ábu jənḥ	gimāl
ג	has a wing	gimāl
ד	nájaġ	dāl
ד	a hatchet	dāl
ה	ġə́jla məqṭūʿa	hē
ה	its leg is severed	hē
ו	'ə́bġi	wāw
ו	a needle	wāw
ז	dəmbūs	zān
ז	a pin	zān
ח	'əmm ġəjeltēn ṣāġ	ḥēṯ
ח	has two intact legs	ḥēṯ
ט	ġə́jla b-báṭna	ṭēṯ
ט	its leg is in its stomach	ṭēṯ
י	'ə́xtak lə-zġayyġi	yōd
י	your young sister	yōd
כ	ġazūna mdáwwġa	kāf
כ	a round niche	kāf
ל	l-jámal	lamād
ל	the camel	lamād
מ	ġāsa zbibāyi	mīm
מ	its head is a raisin	mīm
נ	čəngāl	nūn
נ	a hook	nūn
ס	mdáwwaġ	səmmāx
ס	circular	səmmāx
ע	'ábu ġasēn	ʿān
ע	has two heads	ʿān
פ	b-ṯə́mma zbibāyi	pē
פ	has a raisin in its mouth	pē
צ	ġasēn w-mə́ḥni	ṣād
צ	two heads and bent	ṣād
ק	ġə́jlu ṭwīli	qōf
ק	its leg is long	qōf
ר	məčrūx	rōš
ר	curved	rōš
ש	'ábu tláṯ-ġūs	šīn
ש	has three heads	šīn
ת	ġə́jla məʿġūja	tā
ת	its leg is crooked	tā
ﭏ	sálām	'alēf-lamād
ﭏ	Salaam (peace)	'alēf-lamād

== Phonology ==
=== Consonants ===
Jewish Baghdadi consonants
		Labial		Dental		Palato- alveolar	Palatal	Velar	Uvular	Pharyngeal	Glottal
		plain	velarized	plain	velarized	Palato- alveolar	Palatal	Velar	Uvular	Pharyngeal	Glottal
Nasal		m	(mˠ)	n	(nˠ)						
Plosive	voiceless	p		t	tˠ			k	q		ʔ
Plosive	voiced	b	(bˠ)	d				ɡ			
Affricate	voiceless					t͡ʃ					
Affricate	voiced					d͡ʒ					
Fricative	voiceless	f		θ				x		ħ	h
Fricative	voiced	(v)		ð	ðˠ			ɣ		ʕ	
Approximant		w					j				
Lateral				l	(lˠ)						
Trill				r							

JB is relatively conservative in preserving Classical Arabic phonemes. Classical Arabic /q/ has remained as a uvular (or post-velar) stop, (Note: Though in a few phrases it has become [dʒ], e.g. 'īd mən wára w-'īd mən jəddām 'one hand behind and one in front' (said when someone returns emptyhanded).) like Christian Baghdad Arabic, but unlike in Muslim Baghdad Arabic where it is pronounced as [ɡ]. /k/ is retained as [k], like in Christian Baghdadi, but unlike the Muslim dialect where it is sometimes [tʃ]. Classical Arabic interdental /ð, θ, ðˠ/ are preserved, like in Muslim Baghdadi Arabic (Christian Baghdadi Arabic merges them into /d, t, dˤ/). /dˤ/ has merged into /ðˠ/.

There are a few rare minimal pairs with /lˠ, bˠ/ (e.g. wáḷḷa 'by God! (an oath)' vs. wálla 'he went away', ḅāḅa 'father, dad' vs. bāba 'her door'). In other words, there are velarized segments which cannot be demonstrated to be phonemic, but which cannot be substituted, e.g. ṃāṃa 'mother, mummy'. There is a certain degree of velarization harmony.

/r/ is one of the primary distinguishing features of Jewish (as opposed to Muslim, but not Christian) Baghdadi Arabic. Older Arabic /r/ has shifted to /ɣ/ (as in Christian, but not Muslim, Baghdadi Arabic). However /r/ has been re-introduced in non-Arabic loans (e.g. brāxa 'blessing' < Heb. ברכה, qūri 'teapot' < Pers. qūrī). Modern loan words from other Arabic dialects also have this sound; this sometimes leads to cases where the same word may have two forms depending on context, e.g. ʿáskaġ 'army' vs. ḥākəm ʿáskari 'martial law'. There are many instances where this alternation leads to a subtle change in meaning, e.g. faġġ 'he poured, served food' vs. farr 'he threw'.

The consonants /p, ɡ, tʃ/ were originally of foreign origin, but have pervaded the language to the extent that native speakers do not perceive or even realize their non-native origin.

=== Vowels ===
Jewish Baghdadi vowels
	Front	Central	Back
Close	i iː		u uː
Close-mid		ə	
Mid	e eː		o oː
Open		a aː	

=== Suprasegmentals ===
Stress is usually on the ultimate or penultimate syllable, but sometimes on the antipenultimate (mostly in loans or compound words).

== Grammar ==
=== Verbs ===
Perfect inflectional suffixes
			Unstressed	Stressed
s.	1		-tu	-tō (tū/u)^{1}
s.	2	m	-t	-t
s.	2	f	-ti	-tē (tī/i)^{1}
s.	3	m	-	-
s.	3	f	-ət	-ət
pl.	1		-na	-nā
pl.	2		-təm	-təm
pl.	3		-u	-ō (ū/u)^{1}

Paradigm of kátab 'to write' in perfect alone and with a 3ms indirect object
s.	1		ktábtu	ktəbtōlu
s.	2	m	ktabt	ktábtlu
s.	2	f	ktábti	ktəbtēlu
s.	3	m	kátab	ktáblu
s.	3	f	kátbət	kətbə́tlu
pl.	1		ktábna	ktəbnālu
pl.	2		ktábtəm	ktabtə́mlu
pl.	3		kátbu	kətbōlu

1. before 3f.s. direct pronominal suffix

Imperfect inflectional affixes
s.	1		'a-
s.	2	m	tə-
s.	2	f	t- ... ēn
s.	3	m	yə-^{1}
s.	3	f	tə-
pl.	1		nə-
pl.	2		t- ... ōn
pl.	3		y- ... ōn^{1}

Paradigm of kátab 'to write' in imperfect
s.	1		'áktəb
s.	2	m	tə́ktəb
s.	2	f	tkətbēn^{2}
s.	3	m	yə́ktəb
s.	3	f	tə́ktəb
pl.	1		nə́ktəb
pl.	2		tkətbōn^{2}
pl.	3		ykətbōn^{2}

1. may be actualized as i before another consonant, e.g. yqūl > iqūl 'he'll say'
2. n is elided when a direct or indirect object pronoun suffix is present, e.g. tkətbēla 'you (f.s.) will write to her'

when the 3f.s. direct object pronoun suffix is present, ē > ī/iy and ō > ū/uw, e.g. tkətbīha/tkətbíya 'you (f.s.) will write it (f.s.)'

Direct object pronominal suffixes
s.	1		ni^{1}, (y)(y)i^{2}
s.	2	m	ak^{3}, k^{4}
s.	2	f	ək^{3}, ki^{4}
s.	3	m	nu^{3}, u^{4}
s.	3	f	ha^{5}, a^{3,5}
pl.	1		na
pl.	2		kəm
pl.	3		həm^{4}, əm^{3}

Indirect object pronominal suffixes
s.	1		-li
s.	2	m	-lak
s.	2	f	-lək
s.	3	m	-lu
s.	3	f	-la
pl.	1		-lna
pl.	2		-lkəm
pl.	3		-ləm

Double object pronominal suffixes (Note: Used to specify the indirect object while leaving the direct object unspecified, e.g. jabəlyāk 'he brought it/him/her/them to you (m.s.)'.)
s.	1		-lyā (lyānu)
s.	2	m	-lyāk (lkyā, kəlyā)
s.	2	f	-lyāki
s.	3	m	-lyānu (lyā)
s.	3	f	-lyāha
pl.	1		-lnyā
pl.	2		-lyākəm
pl.	3		-lyāhəm

1. after verbal forms (and rarely particles)
2. after nouns and particles
3. after a consonant
4. after a vowel
5. (ha and a may both occur after some vowels, and in some instances ha may become ya or wa)

== See also ==
- Baghdadi Arabic
- Judeo-Arabic dialects
- Judeo-Iraqi Arabic
- Mesopotamian Arabic
- History of the Jews in Iraq
