= South Mesopotamian Arabic =

Arabic variety of southern Iraq

- South Iraqi Arabic; Marsh Arabic
- Native to: Iraq
- Language family: Afro-Asiatic: Semitic; West Semitic; Central Semitic; Arabic; Mesopotamian; Gilit; South Mesopotamian Arabic
- Dialects: Basrawi
- Writing system: Arabic alphabet

Language codes
- ISO 639-3: –

South Mesopotamian Arabic (Arabic: اللهجة العراقية الجنوبية, romanized: al-lahja l-ʿirāqiyya l-janūbiyya) or Marsh Arabic or commonly known as Basrawai is a variety of Mesopotamian Arabic spoken by Southern Iraqis in Basra, Maysan, Dhi Qar, Wasit and Muthanna. This dialect differs distinctly from other dialects of Iraq and features a strong Aramaic and Sumerian influence. One of the most noticeable features of South Mesopotamian Arabic is the existence of the sounds [ɡ] (< */q/), [tʃ] (< */k/), [ʒ] (< */dʒ/) and /p/.

== Phonology ==
The following describes the sounds of the Baṣra dialect:

=== Consonants ===
		Labial		Dental		Alveolar		Palatal	Velar	Uvular	Pharyngeal	Glottal
		plain	emph.	plain	emph.	plain	emph.	Palatal	Velar	Uvular	Pharyngeal	Glottal
Nasal		m	mˤ			n						
Stop/ Affricate	voiceless	(p)	(pˤ)			t	tˤ	t͡ʃ	k	(q)		ʔ
Stop/ Affricate	voiced	b	bˤ			d		d͡ʒ	ɡ			
Fricative	voiceless	f	fˤ	θ		s	sˤ	ʃ	x		ħ	h
Fricative	voiced			ð	ðˤ	z	zˤ	(ʒ)	ɣ		ʕ	
Flap						ɾ	ɾˤ					
Approximant						l	lˤ	j	w			

- Sounds /p, pˤ/ are only heard from loanwords.
- [ɡ] is more commonly heard as the reflex of /q/ in the Baṣra dialect, whereas /q/ more commonly is heard in cultural words or names.
- /d͡ʒ/ may also be heard as a fricative [ʒ] in rural areas.

=== Vowels ===
	Front	Central	Back
Close	i iː		u uː
Mid	eː		o oː
Open	a aː		

- /i/ can be heard as [ɪ] in word-final positions. It may be pronounced as [ɨ̞] when in positions of pharyngeal consonants
- /u/ can be heard as [ʊ] in word-final positions. It may be pronounced as [o] when after pharyngealized consonants.
- /a, aː/ is typically heard as [æ, æː] when in palatal consonant environments. It is heard as [ɒ, ɒː] when in pharyngealized environments.

== See also ==
- Varieties of Arabic
- Mesopotamian Arabic
