= Mesopotamian Arabic =

Continuum of mutually intelligible varieties of Arabic

- al-lahja al-ʿirāqiyya
- اللهجة العراقية
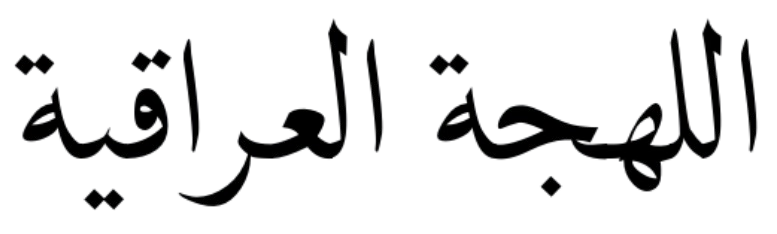
- al-lahja al-ʿirāqiyya 'the Iraqi dialect' written in Arabic calligraphy (Naskh)
- Native to: Iraq, Syria, Turkey, Iran
- Region: Mesopotamia, Khuzestan, Cilicia
- Ethnicity: Mainly Iraqi Arabs also used as a L2 language by non Arab communities in the region
- Speakers: Gelet/South (acm): 20 million (2021–2024); Qeltu/North (ayp): 11 million (2024–2025); Total Gilit/Qeltu: 32 million (2021–2025)
- Language family: Afro-Asiatic: Semitic; West Semitic; Central Semitic; Arabic; Mesopotamian Arabic
- Dialects: Gelet; Qeltu; Judeo-Iraqi
- Writing system: Arabic alphabet

Language codes
- ISO 639-3: Variously: acm – Gelet ayp – Qeltu yhd – Judeo-Iraqi Arabic
- Glottolog: meso1252 nort3142
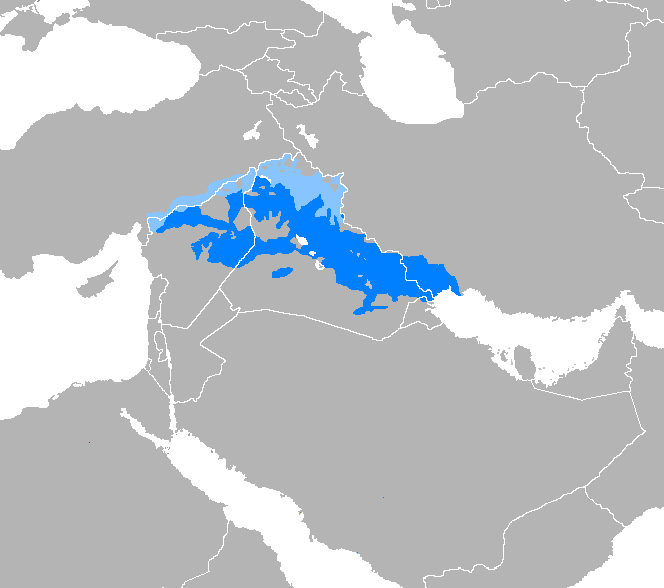
- Areas where Mesopotamian Arabic is widely spoken (dark blue: majority tongue) (light blue: minority tongue)

An Iraqi man speaking about his life and the occupation of Iraq in his dialect of Arabic.

Mesopotamian Arabic (Arabic: لهجة بلاد ما بين النهرين), also known as Iraqi Arabic or the Iraqi dialect (Arabic: اللهجة العراقية), or just as Iraqi (Arabic: عراقي), are the varieties of Arabic spoken in the Mesopotamian basin of Iraq as well as parts of Syria, southeastern Turkey, Iran, and Kuwait and in Iraqi diaspora communities.

== History ==
Aramaic was the lingua franca in Mesopotamia from the early 1st millennium BCE until the late 1st millennium CE, and as may be expected, Mesopotamian Arabic shows signs of an Aramaic substrate. Gelet and the Judeo-Iraqi Arabic varieties have retained features found in Jewish Babylonian Aramaic.

== Varieties ==
Mesopotamian Arabic has two major varieties: Gelet and Qeltu, also called "North Mesopotamian". Their names derive from the form of the word for "I said" in each variety. Gelet Arabic is a Bedouin variety spoken by Muslims (both sedentary and non-sedentary) in central and Lower Mesopotamia and by nomads in the rest of Iraq. Qeltu Arabic is an urban dialect spoken by non-Muslims in this same region, including Baghdad, and by the sedentary population (both Muslims and non-Muslims) in Upper Mesopotamia. Non-Muslims include Christians, Yazidis, and Jews, until most Iraqi Jews were exiled from Iraq in the 1940s–1950s. Geographically, the gelet–qeltu classification roughly corresponds to respectively Upper Mesopotamia and Lower Mesopotamia. The isogloss is between the Tigris and Euphrates, around Fallujah and Samarra.

During the Siege of Baghdad in 1258, the Mongol Empire killed all Muslims in the city and environs. However, sedentary Christians and Jews were spared, and Upper Mesopotamia was untouched. In Lower Mesopotamia, sedentary Muslims were gradually replaced by Bedouins from the countryside. This explains the current dialect distribution: in the south, inhabitants speak Bedouin varieties closer to Gulf Arabic; they are descended from Bedouin varieties of the Arabian Peninsula. The exception is urban non-Muslims, who continue to speak pre-1258 Qeltu dialects. In contrast, in the north, Qeltu Arabic is widely spoken by Muslims and non-Muslims alike.

Gelet/qeltu verb contrasts
s-stem	Bedouin/gelet	Sedentary/qeltu
1st sing.	ḏạrab-t	fataḥ-tu
2nd m. sing.	ḏạrab-t	fataḥ-t
2nd f. sing.	tišṛab-īn	tǝšrab-īn
2nd pl.	tišṛab-ūn	tǝšrab-ūn
3rd pl.	yišṛab-ūn	yǝšrab-ūn

=== Dialects ===
Gelet dialects include:

- Gilit Mesopotamian Arabic
  - Northwestern Mesopotamian group
    - Shāwi dialects (including Urfa and Raqqah)
    - Rural dialects of northern and central Iraq.
  - Central Iraqi Group
    - Baghdadi Arabic
    - The surrounding area around Baghdad
  - Southern Iraqi and Khuzestani Arabic group
    - Urban dialects
    - Rural dialects
    - South Mesopotamian Arabic of the Marsh Arabs of the Mesopotamian Marshes

Qeltu dialects include:

- North Mesopotamian Arabic
  - Anatolian Arabic
    - Mardin dialects: Mardin and surrounding villages, Mhallami, Qamishli, Nusaybin (Christians), Cizre (Jews)
    - Siirt dialects
    - Diyarbakır dialects: Diyarbakır (Christians and Jews), Diyarbakır villages (Christians), Siverek, Çermik and Urfa (Jews)
    - Kozluk–Sason–Muş dialects
  - Tigris Qeltu
    - Moslawi: Mosul and surrounding villages (Bahzani, Bashiqa, Ain Sifni)
    - Moslawi group (Jews only)
      - Northern Moslawi: Sandur, Akre, Erbil, Šoš
      - Southern Moslawi: Kirkuk, Tuz Khurmatu, Khanaqin
    - Tikrit and surroundings
    - Baghdad Jewish Arabic and Baghdadi Christian Arabic
  - Euphrates Qeltu
    - Khawetna (Syria, Iraq, Turkey)
    - Deir ez-Zor
    - Anah and Abu Kamal
    - Hit, Iraq

Baghdadi Arabic is Iraq's de facto national vernacular, as about half of the population speaks it as a mother tongue, and most other Iraqis understand it. It is spreading to northern cities as well. Other Arabic speakers cannot easily understand Moslawi and Baghdadi. The Iraqi dialect is notable for its diversity and its general closeness to Modern Standard Arabic (MSA), with Iraqis often capable of pronouncing classical Arabic with proper phonetics.

=== Qeltu Dialect ===
Mesopotamian Arabic varies depending on the region. In the north, Qeltu Arabic is sometimes simply as Moslawi after the city of Mosul. This variety closely resembles Modern Standard Arabic in its pronunciation of the letter qaf. Most Iraqis pronounce the qaf as a voiced velar plosive /g/, similar to the Egyptian "g". For example, in southern Iraq, the word قال "he said" is pronounced /gaːl/ [ɡɑːl]. In contrast, qeltu speakers pronounce it with a /q/.

As you travel south from Mosul, the dialect begins to shift toward a Bedouin-influenced variety, especially in towns like Baiji, Sharqat, al-Alam, and al-Duluiya in Saladin Governorate. However, in Tikrit and al-Dour, the dialect remains closer to the Moslawi variety.

=== Baghdadi Dialect ===
In central Iraq, areas like Diyala Governorate, Balad, and Dujail have dialects that are similar to Baghdadi Arabic, though with more Bedouin influence.

Baghdadi Arabic is renowned for its simplicity, slow pace, and clarity, making it one of the varieties of Arabic that is closest to classical Arabic.

The Hilla variety, spoken in Babylon Governorate, is also quite similar to the Baghdadi dialect.

The Anbari dialect spoken in western Iraq, particularly in cities like Ramadi and Fallujah, is a blend of Baghdadi and Bedouin speech. It features many old Bedouin expressions and is generally considered clear and light.

=== Gelet Dialects ===
The Najafi dialect is closer to rural speech, often involving vowel shifts at the beginning of verbs. Najafi speakers also use the word چه [tʃa], which means “then” or “so.” This word originates from the Eastern Aramaic word “ka,” which has the same meaning and function, especially before verbs.

As one moves further south, the rural Iraqi dialect becomes more prominent. Most poets of colloquial Iraqi Arabic hail from the southern countryside, where Iraqis are widely familiar with the dialect.

This dialect is similar to the Najafi one but also includes many words with classical, eloquent roots. For this reason, rural poets are often more expressive than their urban counterparts, and their voices are considered more stirring and powerful when reciting poetry.

The rural dialect is characterized by its simplicity and speed, though city dwellers may find some words hard to understand.

The Basrawi dialect is the Iraqi dialect most closely related to the Gulf dialect. It differs markedly from the southern rural dialect and is a mix of urban and Bedouin Gulf dialects, with additional influences from Persian, English, and Turkish. It also carries elements of the southern rural dialect. The Basrawi dialect is widely spoken in Basra, especially among families from old Basra, as well as in areas like Zubair, Abu Al-Khaseeb, Safwan, Umm Qasr, and parts of Nasiriyah. However, this dialect has been gradually declining due to heavy rural migration into cities during the mid-20th century, leading to a blending with southern rural dialects.

== Substrate ==
Mesopotamian Arabic, especially North Mesopotamian Arabic, has a significant Eastern Aramaic substrate, and through it also has significant influences from the ancient languages of Mesopotamia, Sumerian and Akkadian. Eastern Aramaic dialects flourished and became the lingua franca throughout Mesopotamia when it was Achaemenid Assyria . Mesopotamian Arabic also was influenced by New Persian, Mongolic, Turkic (including Ottoman Turkish), and Koine Greek.

== See also ==
- Varieties of Arabic
- Modern Standard Arabic
