= Languages of Morocco =

- Official: Modern Standard Arabic; Standard Moroccan Tamazight
- Vernacular: Arabic dialects (92.7%): Moroccan Arabic: (91.9%); Hassaniya: (0.8%); Amazigh languages (24.8%): Tashelhit (14.2%); Central Atlas Tamazight (7.4%); Tarifit (3.2%)
- Foreign: French (36%); English (14%); Spanish (4.5%)
- Signed: Moroccan Sign Language
- Keyboard layout: Arabic keyboard

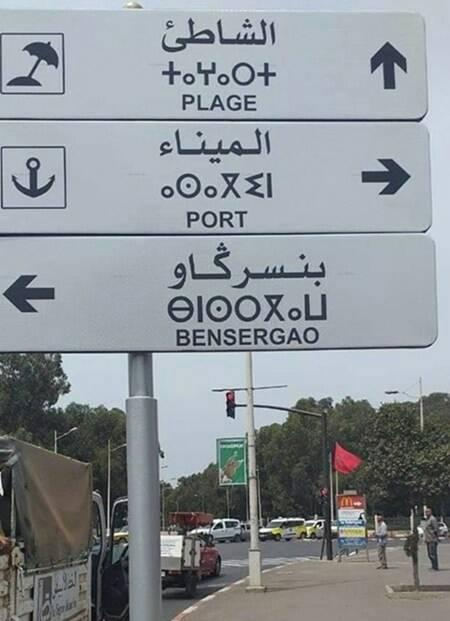
Sign in Arabic, Berber and French in Agadir

The official languages of Morocco are Modern Standard Arabic and Standard Moroccan Tamazight. Moroccan Arabic (known as Darija) is the primary spoken vernacular and lingua franca, but a number of regional and foreign languages are also spoken. According to the 2024 Moroccan census, 92.7% of the population (including second-language speakers) spoke Arabic, whereas 24.8% spoke Amazigh languages. Despite this, estimates of speakers of an Amazigh language from academic institutions like INALCO and independent linguists such as Moha Ennaji and Fatima Sadiqi range from 40% to 45%.

The languages of prestige in Morocco are Arabic in its Classical and Modern Standard forms and sometimes French, the latter of which serves as a second language for approximately 33% of Moroccans. According to the 2024 census, 99.2% or almost the entire literate population of Morocco could read and write in Arabic, whereas only 1.5% of the population could read and write in Tifinagh, the official alphabet for Standard Moroccan Tamazight. When it comes to foreign languages, this figure rises to 57.7% in French, 20.5% in English, and 1.2% in Spanish. The census also reveals that 80.6% of Moroccans consider Arabic to be their native language, while 18.9% regard any of the various Amazigh languages as their mother tongue.

According to a 2000–2002 survey done by Moha Ennaji, author of Multilingualism, Cultural Identity, and Education in Morocco, "there is a general agreement that Standard Arabic, Moroccan Arabic, and Amazigh are the national languages." Ennaji also concluded "This survey confirms the idea that multilingualism in Morocco is a vivid sociolinguistic phenomenon, which is favored by many people."

French retains a major place in Morocco, as it is taught universally and serves as Morocco's primary language of commerce and economics, culture, sciences and medicine; it is also widely used in education and government. Morocco is a member of the Francophonie. Spanish is spoken by many Moroccans, particularly in the northern regions around Tetouan and Tangier, as well as in parts of the south, due to historic ties and business interactions with Spain.

== History ==
Mother tongues of Moroccans (per 2024 census)
1. Arabic (80.6%)
2. Berber languages (18.9%)
3. Others (0.50%)

Historically, languages such as Phoenician, Punic, and Berber languages have been spoken in Morocco. Juba II, king of Mauretania, wrote in Greek and Latin. It is unclear how long African Romance was spoken, but its influence on Northwest African Arabic (particularly in the language of northwestern Morocco) indicates it must have had a significant presence in the early years after the Arab conquest.

Arabic came with the Muslim conquest of the Maghreb; Abdellah Guennoun cites the Friday sermon delivered by Tariq Ibn Ziad just before the conquest of al-Andalus in 711 as the first instance of Moroccan literature in Arabic. However, the language spread much more slowly than the religion. At first, Arabic was used only in urban areas, especially in cities in the north, while the rural areas remained the domain of Berber languages.

Under the Almohads, the khuṭbas (from خطبة, the Friday sermon) had to be delivered in Arabic and Berber, or as the Andalusi historian Ibn Ṣāḥib aṣ-Ṣalāt described it: "al-lisān al-gharbī" (اللسان الغربي 'the western tongue'). The khaṭīb, or sermon-giver, of al-Qarawiyyīn Mosque in Fes, Mahdī b. ‘Īsā, was replaced under the Almohads by Abū l-Ḥasan b. ‘Aṭiyya khaṭīb because the latter was fluent in Berber.

The first recorded work in Darija or Moroccan Arabic is Al-Kafif az-Zarhuni's epic zajal poem "al-Mala'ba," dating back to the reign of Marinid Sultan Abu al-Hasan Ali ibn Othman.

During the Middle Ages, sailors and traders in the Mediterranean, including the Barbary Coast, developed a contact language known as Mediterranean Lingua Franca or sabir. It was influenced by the languages of Italy, Catalan, Occitan, Berber, Arabic, Spanish and Portuguese. Its use declined after the European conquest.

=== Language policy ===
After Morocco gained independence with the end of the French protectorate in 1956, it started a process of Arabization. For this task, the Institute for Studies and Research on Arabization was established by decree in 1960. The policy of Arabization was not applied in earnest until 17 years after independence. An editorial in Lamalif in 1973 argued that, although French unified the elite and major sections of the economy, national unity could only be achieved based on Arabic—though Lamalif called for a new incarnation of the language, describing Standard Arabic as untenably prescriptive and Moroccan vernacular Arabic (Darija) as too poor to become in and of itself a language of culture and knowledge.

In the year 2000, after years of neglecting and ignoring the other languages present in Morocco, the Charter for Educational Reform recognized them and the necessity for them.

Until then the Berber languages were marginalized in the modern society and the number of monolingual speakers decreased. In recent years, the Berber culture has been gaining strength and some developments promise that these languages will not die.

Arabic, on the other hand, has been perceived as a prestigious language in Morocco for over a millennium. However, there are very distinctive varieties of Arabic used, not all equally prestigious, which are MSA (Modern Standard Arabic), the written form used in schools and 'Dialectal Arabic', the non-standardized spoken form. The difference between the two forms in terms of grammar, phonology and vocabulary is so great, it can be considered as diglossia. MSA is practically foreign to Moroccan schoolchildren, and this creates problems with reading and writing, consequently leading to a high level of illiteracy in Morocco.

The French language is also dominant in Morocco, especially in education and administration, therefore was initially learned by an elite and later on was learned by a great number of Moroccans for use in domains such as finance, science, technology and media. That is despite the government decision to implement a language policy of ignoring French after gaining independence, for the sake of creating a monolingual country.

From its independence until the year 2000, Morocco opted for Arabization as a policy, in an attempt of replacing French with Arabic. By the end of the 1980s, Arabic was the dominant language in education, although French was still in use in many important domains. The goals of Arabization were not met, in linguistic terms, therefore a change was needed. By 2020, the country ended its policy of Arabization, with French reimplemented as the medium of instruction in core subjects such as science and math.

In 2000 the Charter of Educational Reform introduced a drastic change in language policy. From then on, Morocco has adopted a clear perpetual educational language policy with three main cores: improving and reinforcing the teaching of Arabic, using a variety of languages, such as English and French in teaching the fields of technology and science and acceptance of Berber. The state of Morocco still sees Arabic (MSA) as its national language, but acknowledges that not all Moroccans are Arabic speakers and that Arabization did not succeed in the area of science and technology. The aims of the charter seem to have been met faster than expected, probably since the conditions of the charter started to be implemented immediately. In the early twenty-first century the different minority languages are acknowledged in Morocco although Arabic is still dominant and is being promoted by the government.

Berber was made an official language in 2011. In 2019, a law was enacted to implement the constitutional changes from 2011. The government aims to generalize Berber education to all Moroccan schools. However, as of 2023, only 10% of Moroccan pupils study Berber. The government hired civil servants able to speak the three main dialects (Tachalhit, Tamazight and Tarifet) to help citizens in courts, hospitals, and other public services. According to a 2012 study by the Government of Spain, 98% of Moroccans spoke Moroccan Arabic, 63% spoke French, 26% Berber, 14% spoke English, and 10% spoke Spanish.

== Education ==
Literate population of Morocco (2024)
	percent
Can read and write in Arabic	99.2%
Can read and write in French	57.7%
Can read and write in English	20.5%
Can read and write in Berber languages	1.5%
Can read and write in Spanish	1.2%
Can read and write in other languages	1%

Framework Law 17:51 allowed scientific subjects to be taught in foreign languages—especially French—in public elementary schools.

In 2019, the Parliament voted to expand Berber classes to all Moroccan schools. According to Prime Minister Aziz Akhannouch, about 2,000 schools taught Amazigh in 2022 and the government was training more teachers to accelerate the roll out of Berber teaching. As of 2023, this reform is still in progress.

In July 2023, the gradual generalization of learning English from secondary school was decided by the Ministry of Education.

== Arabic ==
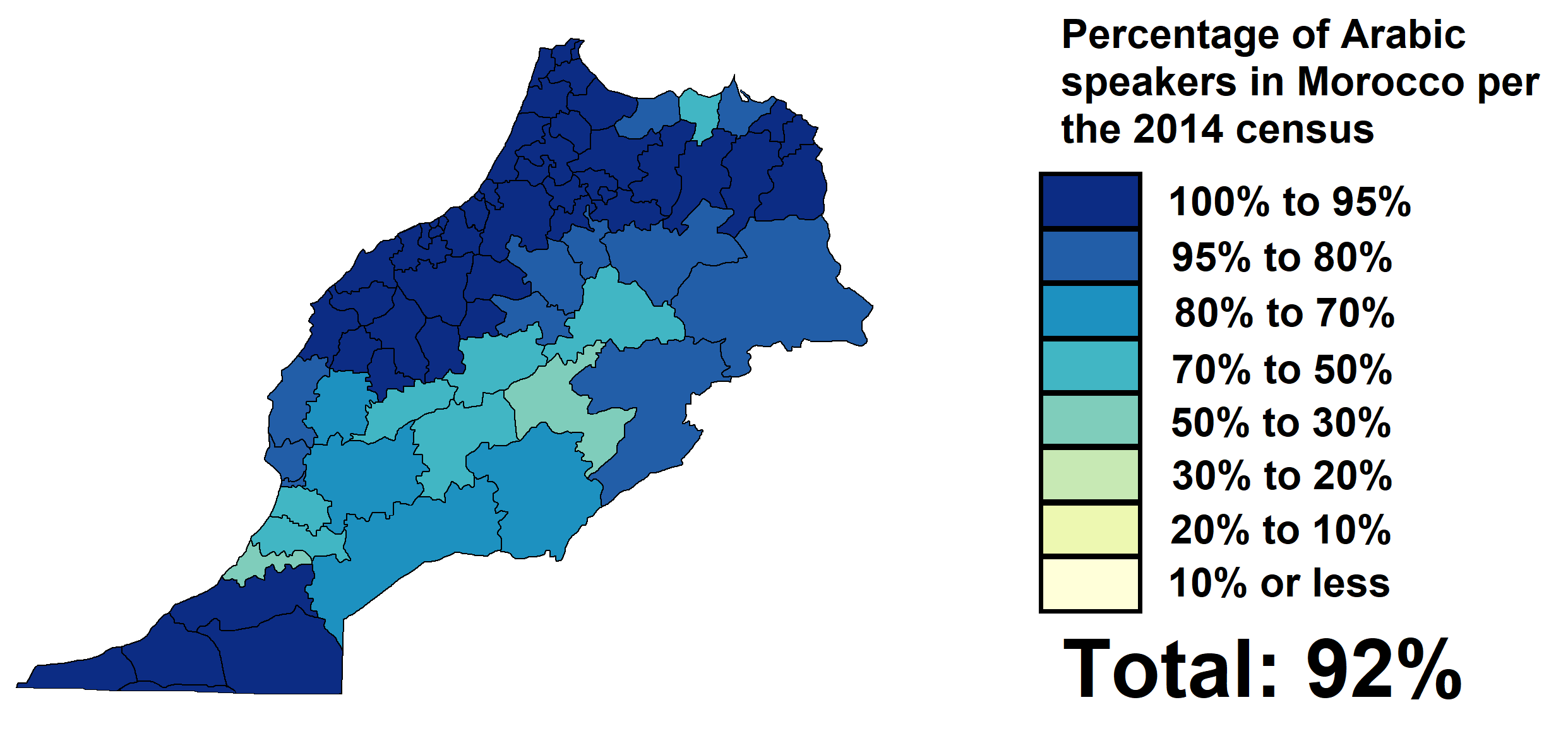
Percentage of Arabic speakers in Morocco by subdivision

Arabic, along with Berber, is one of Morocco's two official languages, although it is the Moroccan dialect of Arabic, namely Darija, meaning "everyday/colloquial language"; that is spoken or understood, frequently as a second language, by the majority of the population (about 85% of the total population). Many native Berber speakers also speak the local Arabic variant as a second language. Arabic in its Classical and Standard forms is one of the two prestige languages in Morocco. Aleya Rouchdy, editor of Language Contact and Language Conflict in Arabic, said that Classical/Modern Arabic and French are constantly in conflict with one another, but that most Moroccans believe that the bilingualism of Classical Arabic and French is the most optimal choice to allow for Morocco's development.

In 1995 the number of native Arabic speakers in Morocco was approximately 18.8 million (65% of the total population), and 21 million including the Moroccan diaspora.

As a member of the Maghrebi Arabic grouping of dialects, Moroccan Arabic is similar to the dialects spoken in Mauritania, Algeria, Tunisia, and Libya (and also Maltese). The so called Darija dialect of Morocco is quite different from its Middle Eastern counterparts but in general understandable to each other, it’s estimated that Darija shares 85%-90% of its vocabulary with Modern Standard Arabic. The country shows a marked difference in urban and rural dialects. This is due to the history of settlement. traditionally, Arabs established centers of power in only a few cities and ports in the region, with the effect that the other areas remained Berber-speaking. Then, in the 13th century, Bedouin tribes swept through many of the unsettled areas, spreading with them their distinct Arabic dialect in the non-urbanized areas and leaving speakers of Berber isolated in the mountainous regions.

=== Modern Standard and Classical Arabic ===
Moroccans learn Standard Arabic as a language. It is generally not spoken at home or on the streets. Standard Arabic is frequently used in administrative offices, mosques, and schools. According to Rouchdy, within Morocco Classical Arabic is still only used in literary and cultural aspects, formal traditional speeches, and discussions about religion.

=== Dialectal Arabic ===
==== Moroccan Arabic ====
Moroccan Arabic, along with Berber, is one of two mother tongues acquired by Moroccan children and spoken in homes and on the street. The language is not used in writing. Abdelâli Bentahila, the author of the 1983 book Language Attitudes among Arabic–French Bilinguals in Morocco, said that Moroccans who were bilingual in both French and Arabic preferred to speak Arabic while discussing religion; while discussing matters in a grocery store or restaurant; and while discussing matters with family members, beggars, and maids. Moroccan linguist Moha Ennaji said that Moroccan Arabic has connotations of informality, and that Moroccan Arabic tends to be used in casual conversations and spoken discourse. Ennaji added that bilingual Moroccans tend to use Moroccan Arabic while in the house. Berbers generally learn Moroccan Arabic as a second language and use it as a lingua franca, since not all versions of Berber are mutually intelligible with one another.

===== 2014 population census by region =====
The below table presents statistical figures of speakers, based on the 2014 population census. This table includes not only native speakers of Arabic, but also people who speak Arabic as a second or third language.

Region	Moroccan Arabic	Total population	% of Moroccan Arabic speakers
Casablanca-Settat	6,785,812	6,826,773	99.4%
Rabat-Salé-Kénitra	4,511,612	4,552,585	99.1%
Fès-Meknès	4,124,184	4,216,957	97.8%
Tanger-Tetouan-Al Hoceima	3,426,731	3,540,012	96.8%
Dakhla-Oued Ed-Dahab (See Western Sahara)	102,049	114,021	89.5%
Marrakesh-Safi	4,009,243	4,504,767	89.0%
Oriental	2,028,222	2,302,182	88.1%
Béni Mellal-Khénifra	2,122,957	2,512,375	84.5%
Laâyoune-Sakia El Hamra (See Western Sahara)	268,509	340,748	78.8%
Souss-Massa	1,881,797	2,657,906	70.8%
Guelmim-Oued	264,029	414,489	63.7%
Drâa-Tafilalet	1,028,434	1,627,269	63.2%
Morocco	30,551,566	33,610,084	90.9%

==== Hassaniya Arabic ====
Hassānīya, is spoken by about 0.8% of the population, mainly in the territory of Western Sahara, claimed by both Morocco and the Sahrawi Arab Democratic Republic. Communities of speakers exist elsewhere in Morocco too.

The below table presents statistical figures of speakers, based on the 2014 population census.

Region	Hassaniya Arabic	Total population	% of Hassaniya Arabic speakers
Laâyoune-Sakia El Hamra	133,914	340,748	39.3%
Guelmim-Oued Noun	86,214	414,489	20.8%
Dakhla-Oued Ed-Dahab	21,322	114,021	18.7%
Souss-Massa	13,290	2,657,906	0.5%
Drâa-Tafilalet	3,255	1,627,269	0.2%
Casablanca-Settat	6,827	6,826,773	0.1%
Rabat-Salé-Kénitra	4,553	4,552,585	0.1%
Marrakesh-Safi	4,505	4,504,767	0.1%
Béni Mellal-Khénifra	2,512	2,512,375	0.1%
Fès-Meknès	0	4,216,957	0.0%
Tanger-Tetouan-Al Hoceima	0	3,540,012	0.0%
Oriental	0	2,302,182	0.0%
Morocco	268,881	33,610,084	0.8%

== Berber ==
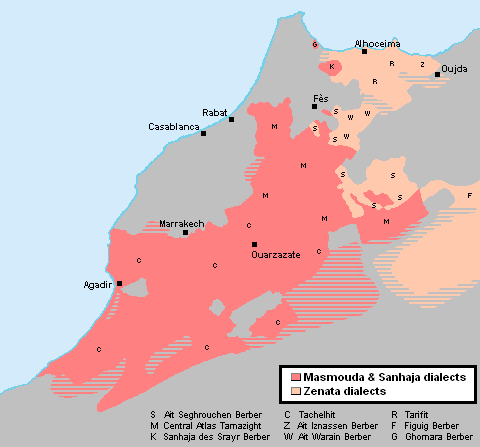
Berber-speaking areas in Morocco

The exact population of speakers of Berber languages is hard to ascertain, since most North African countries do not—traditionally—record language data in their censuses (An exception to this was the 2004 Morocco population census). The Ethnologue provides a useful academic starting point; however, its bibliographic references are inadequate, and it rates its own accuracy at only B-C for the area. Early colonial censuses may provide better documented figures for some countries; however, these are also very much out of date. The number for each Berber language is difficult to estimate.

Berber serves as a vernacular language in many rural areas of Morocco. Berber, along with Moroccan Arabic, is one of two languages spoken in homes and on the street. The population does not use Berber in writing. Aleya Rouchdy, editor of Language Contact and Language Conflict in Arabic, said that Berber is mainly used in the contexts of family, friendship, and "street". In his 2000–2002 research, Ennaji found that 52% of the interviewees placed Berber as a language inferior to Arabic because it did not have a prestigious status and because its domain was restricted. Ennaji added that "[t]he dialectisation of Berber certainly reduces its power of communication and its spread."

Speakers of Riffian language were estimated to be around 1.5 million in 1990. The language is spoken in the Rif area in the north of the country and is one of the three main Berber languages of Morocco.

The Tashelhit language is considered to be the most widely spoken as it covers the whole of the Region Souss-Massa-Drâa, and is also spoken in the Marrakech-Tensift-El Haouz and Tadla-Azilal regions. Studies done in 1990 show around 3 million people, concentrated in the south of Morocco, speak the language.

Central Morocco Tamazight is the second Berber language in Morocco. A 1998 study done by Ethnologue, shows that around 3 million people speak the language in Morocco. The language is most used in the regions Middle Atlas, High Atlas and east High Atlas Mountains.

Other Berber languages are spoken in Morocco, as the Senhaja de Srair and the Ghomara dialects in the Rif mountains, the Oasis Tamazight and Eastern Zenati in eastern Morocco, and Eastern Middle Atlas dialects in central Morocco.

=== 2014 population census ===
Most widely spoken Berber languages in Morocco:

Most widely spoken Berber languages in Morocco	Male	Female	Total
Tashelhit	14.2%	14.1%	14.1%
Tamazight	7.9%	8.0%	7.9%
Tarifit	4.0%	4.1%	4.0%

=== 2014 population census by region ===
The below table presents statistical figures of speakers of Berber languages, based on the 2014 population census.

Region	Tashelhit	Tamazight	Tarifit	% of Berber speakers	Number of Berber speakers	Total population
Drâa-Tafilalet	22.0%	48.5%	0.1%	70.6%	1,148,852	1,627,269
Souss-Massa	65.9%	1.1%	0.1%	67.1%	1,783,455	2,657,906
Guelmim-Oued Noun	52.0%	1.3%	0.2%	53.5%	221,752	414,489
Oriental	2.9%	6.5%	36.5%	45.9%	1,056,702	2,302,182
Béni Mellal-Khénifra	10.6%	30.2%	0.1%	40.9%	1,027,561	2,512,375
Marrakesh-Safi	26.3%	0.5%	0.1%	26.9%	1,211,782	4,504,767
Dakhla-Oued Ed-Dahab	17.9%	4.6%	0.4%	22.9%	26,110	114,021
Fès-Meknès	1.9%	12.9%	2.4%	17.2%	725,317	4,216,957
Laâyoune-Sakia El Hamra	12.8%	2.7%	0.3%	15.8%	53,838	340,748
Tangier-Tetouan-Alhoceima	1.7%	0.6%	10.3%	12.6%	446,041	3,540,012
Rabat-Salé-Kénitra	5.2%	6.3%	0.4%	11.9%	541,758	4,552,585
Casablanca-Settat	6.9%	0.7%	0.2%	7.8%	532,488	6,826,773
Morocco	14.1%	7.9%	4.0%	26.0%	8,738,622	33,610,084

=== 2024 population census by region ===
The below table presents statistical figures of speakers of Berber languages, based on the 2024 population census.

Region	% of native Berber speakers
Drâa-Tafilalet	64%
Souss-Massa	56.4%
Guelmim-Oued Noun	40.2%
Béni Mellal-Khénifra	34.3%
Oriental	32.3%
Marrakesh-Safi	21.6%
Dakhla-Oued Ed-Dahab	14.6%
Fès-Meknès	10.3%
Laâyoune-Sakia El Hamra	8.9%
Tangier-Tetouan-Alhoceima	7.3%
Rabat-Salé-Kénitra	5.2%
Casablanca-Settat	3.6%
Morocco	18.9%

== French ==
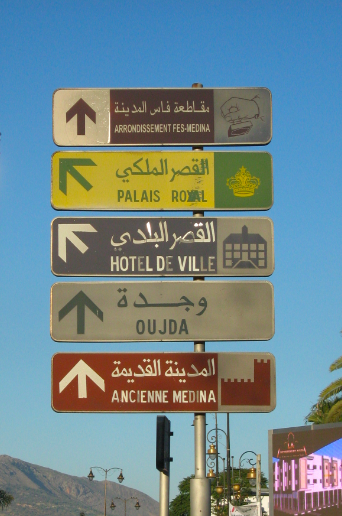
French and Arabic (MSA) coexist in Moroccan administration and business.

Within Morocco, French, one of the country's two prestige languages, is often used for business, diplomacy, and government; and serves as a lingua franca. Aleya Rouchdy, editor of Language Contact and Language Conflict in Arabic, said that "For all practical purposes, French is used as a second language." Some Generation Z protest groups have called for French to be replaced by English as the second foreign language of Morocco.

Different figures of French speakers in Morocco are given. According to the OIF, 36% of Moroccans speak French overall, while 47% of students have French as their medium of instruction at schools. According to the 2014 census, about 66% of literate people can read and write French, that is, 66% of 68% = 45%. Other sources put the number of total French speakers at 64% as of 2014.

== Spanish ==
In a survey from 2005 by the CIDOB (Barcelona Centre for International Affairs), 21.9% of respondents from Morocco claimed to speak Spanish, with higher percentages in the northern regions. By 2017, that figure had declined to about 4.5% of the population.

Spanish was used in northern Morocco and Western Sahara due to Spanish occupation of those areas and the incorporation of Spanish Sahara as a province. After Morocco declared independence in 1956, French and Arabic became the main languages of administration and education, causing the role of Spanish to decline. In northern Morocco, transmission of Spanish television is often available and there are interactions in Spanish on a daily basis in areas bordering the Spanish cities of Ceuta and Melilla.

Today, Spanish is still offered as one of the foreign languages in the educational system but has fallen well behind French and English. According to the Cervantes Institute, there were 11,409 students learning Spanish in Morocco in 2016, a large decline from about 50,000 in 2005. Demand for Spanish and overall competency in the language has fallen since the start of the 21st century.

=== Judeo-Spanish ===
After the expulsion of the Jews from Spain in 1492, thousands of Sephardic Jews took refuge in Morocco. The Jews of Portugal were similarly expelled in 1496. They spoke Old Spanish, Portuguese, Judeo-Catalan, Judeo-Aragonese and other Romance languages. Mixing in Morocco and influenced by local Arabic, their language became Haketia (with an offshoot in Oran, now part of Algeria). Unlike other Judeo-Spanish dialects, Haketia did not develop a literature and, during colonization, North African Sephardim adopted Spanish and French. Emigration to Spain, the Americas, and Israel has significantly reduced the number of speakers of Haketia.

== See also ==
- Arabic
- Berber languages
- Judeo-Arabic
- Judeo-Moroccan Arabic
- Languages of Algeria
- Languages of Mauritania
- Languages of Spain
- Languages of Africa
- Languages of South Africa
- Languages of Tunisia
