= French language in Morocco =

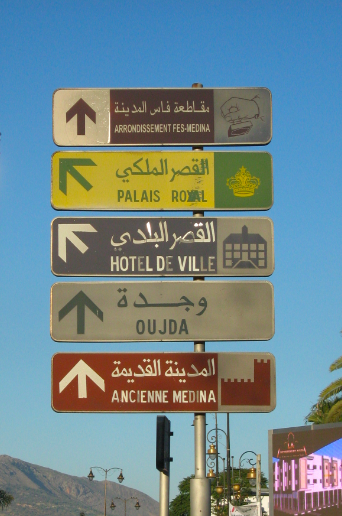
French and Arabic coexist in Moroccan administration and business.

French is one of the languages spoken in Morocco. The use of French is a colonial legacy of the French protectorate (1912–1956) when it served as a lingua franca with non-Moroccans and non-Arabs. French has no officially recognised status in Morocco, but is sometimes used for business, diplomacy, and government. Aleya Rouchdy, author of Language Contact and Language Conflict in Arabic, said that "For all practical purposes, French is used as a second language." As of 2010, French continued to serve as a means of bridging the country "not only to Europe but also to Francophone Africa". Since 2021, the influence of French has significantly declined in Morocco in favour of English.

Estimates of French speakers in Morocco vary by sources. According to the Organisation internationale de la Francophonie, 33% of Moroccans spoke French in 2007, 13.5% being fully francophone (fluent speakers) and 19.5% partially francophone.

== History ==
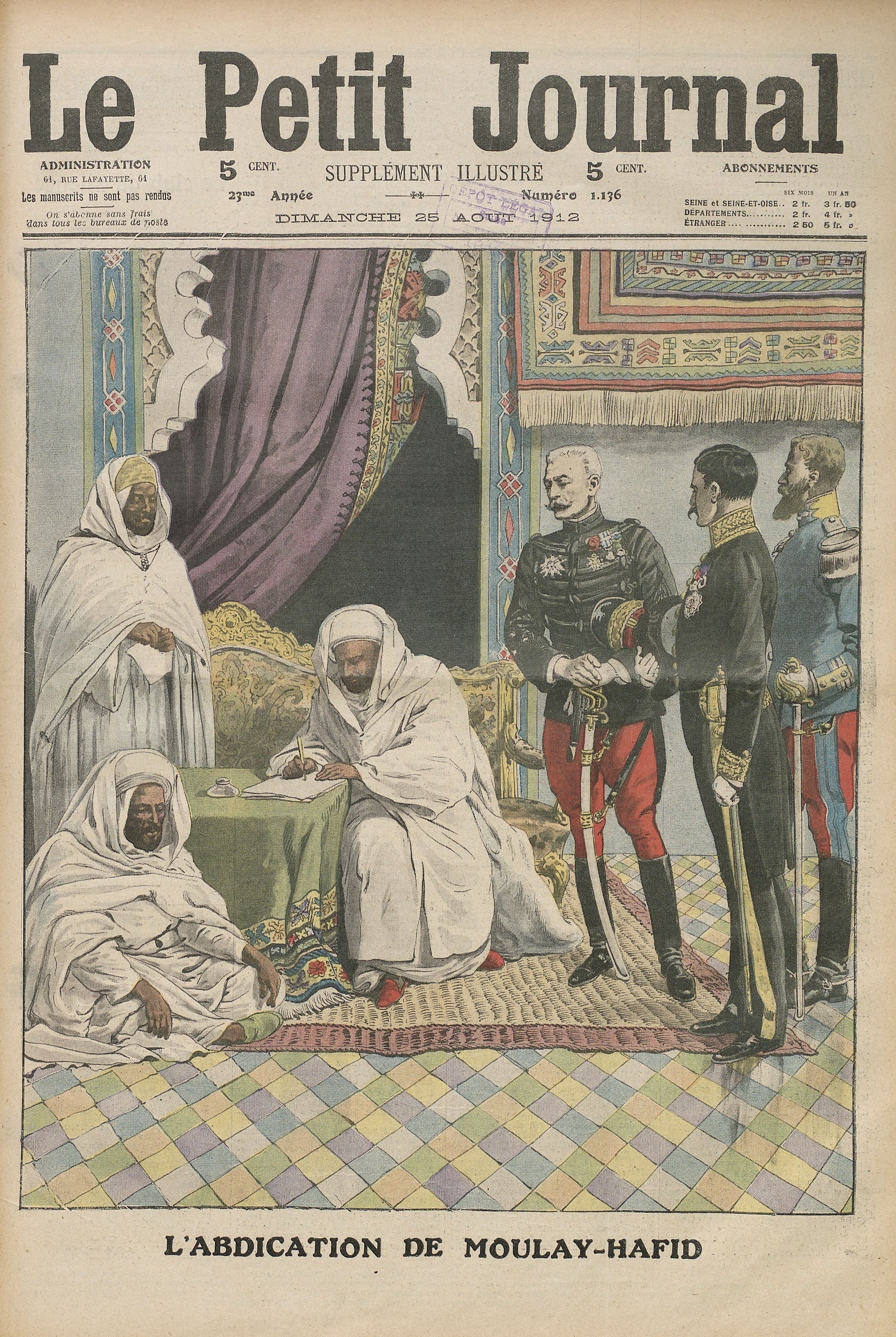
The Treaty of Fes of 1912 created the French protectorate in Morocco, which imposed French in Morocco.

The 1912 Treaty of Fes, which established the French Protectorate in Morocco, was negotiated in French, with Abdelqader Ben Ghabrit interpreting and translating for Sultan Abd al-Hafid, who spoke Arabic. French colonial authorities in Morocco introduced the French language to the country, making it the language of government administration, educational instruction, and the media; therefore Modern Standard Arabic was only used for traditional activities and religious services. The French government had intended for the French culture and the French language to be viewed as "civilization and advancement".

The French authorities forbade Moroccans from publishing newspapers in Arabic, especially if covering politics. Due to these restrictions, the Moroccan journalist Muhammad Ibn al-Hassan al-Wazzaani published L'Action du Peuple (The Work of the People), the first francophone newspaper published by the Moroccan Nationalist Movement in the area under the control of the French Protectorate in Morocco, in Fes on August 4, 1933. The decision to publish in French was controversial; al-Wazzaani, who had studied in France, was one of the few who supported the use of French to address the colonial apparatus in its own language, and influence French popular opinion, both in Morocco and in France.

In 1956 Morocco declared independence, and in the government declared Modern Standard Arabic as the official language. In the early 1960s the Moroccan government began the Arabisation process, in which the Istiqlal leader Allal al-Fassi played a major role. After independence, to facilitate economic growth and to increase its ties to Europe, the Moroccan government decided to strengthen its ties with France, resulting in the promotion of French.

Under Hassan II, Arabisation of the humanities was instrumentalised to suppress critical thought—replacing the subject of "Sociology" with "Islamic Thought," for example—in a move which Susan Gilson Miller described as a "crude and obvious attempt to foster a more conservative atmosphere within academia and to dampen enthusiasm for the radicalising influences filtering in from Europe."

By 2005 Morocco engaged in economic liberalisation and privatisation; Moha Ennaji, author of Multilingualism, Cultural Identity, and Education in Morocco, said that these activities, in many sectors, reinforced the usage of French.

In 2014, 75% of Facebook users in Morocco posted in French.

== Role and purpose ==
French is mainly used in administration, banking, commerce, education, and industry. Rouchdy said that within Morocco, French "is the vehicle of science, technology, and modern culture." Rouchdy further explained that the language had been "maintained for instrumental purposes and for building contacts with the West in general." The French language became entrenched in various aspects of Moroccan society, including education, government, the media, and the private sector due to the French colonial authority enacting a policy to spread the French language throughout Morocco during the colonial era. As of 2005, trade with France made up over 75% of Morocco's international trade. Ennaji wrote, "In this context, one can understand the important status of French, whose colonial connotations have been erased or at least drastically reduced by independence."

Moroccans learn the French language at school. Secondary school graduates tend to achieve French fluency, and many Moroccans become fluent in French in addition to Moroccan Arabic and use French as their second language. Most Moroccans who are bilingual in French and Arabic live in urban areas where they have strong contact with the French language and where there are high literacy rates. Many Moroccans learn French to conduct business with French tourists; gain access to information, science, and technology; and to attend French-speaking educational facilities. Ennaji said that Moroccans learn French for educational, pragmatic, and sociocultural reasons. Ennaji said "The degree of mastery of French depends on the bilingual's level of education and socio-economic background, for the higher the level of education and the wealthier the family background, the bigger the frequency of speaking French and the more frequent the alternative use of French and Moroccan Arabic by a bilingual. These factors determine the bilingual's ability to choose one or the other language in a particular speech situation."

Abdelâli Bentahila, the author of the 1983 book Language Attitudes Among Arabic–French Bilinguals in Morocco, wrote that Moroccans who were bilingual in both French and Arabic commonly spoke French when they discuss matters related to reading, are at a pharmacy, discuss matters with a doctor or employer, and discuss scientific and technical topics. In Morocco, French has connotations of formality; Ennaji said that Moroccans tended to use French to discuss matters at work or at school, and therefore French is commonly spoken in offices and schools. If the other party in a conversation is French educated, Moroccans often speak in French or a mixture of Moroccan Arabic and French. French has a prestigious status in Moroccan society, so many bilingual Moroccans mix French and Moroccan Arabic in conversation or use French words in informal Moroccan Arabic conversations. According to Ennaji, in writing bilingual Moroccans only use French, and bilingual Moroccans tend to discuss scientific and technical topics only in French.

Rouchdy said, "The predominance of French implies that the chances of strengthening the place of Classical Arabic are reduced."

== Attitudes toward French ==
Despite the legacy of colonialism, according to Rouchdy, "French is still widely appreciated by both the ruling elite and the general public." Ennaji said "most Moroccans know that Standard Arabic does not meet all their societal needs and that a European language is necessary for the transfer of ideas and technology, and for communication with the world at large." Rouchdy added that Arabic and French are constantly in conflict with one another, but that most Moroccans believe that the bilingualism of Arabic and French is the most optimal choice to allow for Morocco's development.

== French in art ==
Within academic arts, French is the main language used. Academic art discourse had been conducted in French within a five decade period until 2010. Reviews of artwork and art journal articles mostly were published in French, while some newspaper coverage of gallery exhibits was in Arabic. Katarzyna Pieprzak, author of the 2010 book Imagined Museums: Art and Modernity in Postcolonial Morocco, attributes this to the fact that "modernist or academic visual art is a language that was learned in art schools in Europe, that the use of French reflects a desire to be heard and to participate in a Western-controlled international art sphere and market, and that audiences for both the museum and its artwork tend to be imagined as Francophone." French has been the main language of art museums in Morocco; the Oudaya Museum, a national art museum, had many object labels in Arabic and French, although the object histories were only available in French in 2010.

== See also ==
- France–Morocco relations
- French Protectorate in Morocco
- Geographical distribution of French speakers
- Language Attitudes Among Arabic-French Bilinguals in Morocco
- Moroccans in France
