= Yud =

Yud or YUD may refer to:

- Yodh or Yud, the tenth letter of many Semitic alphabets
- Umiujaq Airport (IATA airport code YUD), Umiujaq, Quebec, Canada
- Yugoslavian dinar (ISO 4217 currency code YUD), the currency of Yugoslavia
- Judeo-Tripolitanian Arabic (ISO 639 language code yud), a dialect of Arabic spoken in Israel and Italy
- Eliezer Yudkowsky, sometimes called Yud online, a writer and researcher on decision theory and artificial intelligence

== See also ==
- Yud-Alef Stadium, a football stadium in Ashdod, Israel
