= AYL =

AYL, ayl, etc. may refer to:

- Ayl, municipality in Germany
- ayl, ISO 639-3 code for Eastern Libyan Arabic
- Australian Young Labor
- Club All Youth Linkage
