= Fatima Sadiqi =

Linguist

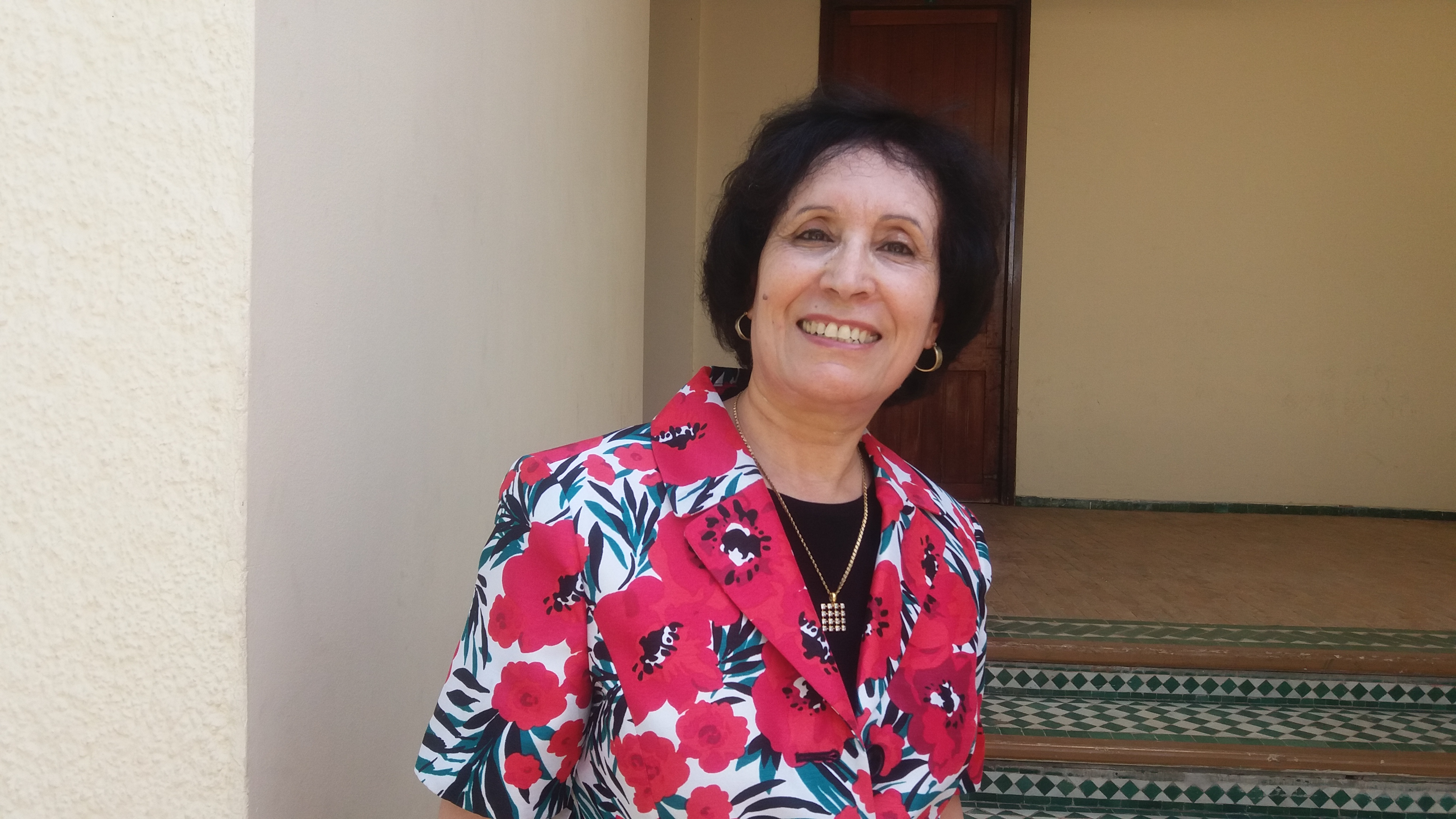
- Professor of Linguistics and Gender Studies
- Born: 21 March 1953, Kenitra, Morocco
- Notable work: Women, Gender, and Language in Morocco
- Spouse: Moha Ennaji

Fatima Sadiqi (Arabic: فاطمة صديقي) is a senior professor of Linguistics and Gender Studies at Sidi Mohamed Ben Abdellah University, in Fez, Morocco.

== Early life ==
Fatima Sadiqi is the daughter of Haj Mohamed Ben Mohamed ou Lahcen Sadiqi and Hajja Fadma Bent Haj Ahmed N’ayt Bourhim. Her father was a military officer of rural origin. Sadiqi was born in Kenitra, Morocco as the eldest of nine children. Fatima Sadiqi is married to Moha Ennaji.

== Education ==
Sadiqi received her primary education in Nador, junior secondary school education in Taourirt, and high school education in Oujda. From 1971 to 1976, she studied English language and literature at the Faculty of Letters, Rabat. She earned a Teaching and Pedagogy Certificate from L’Ecole Normale Supérieure, Rabat in 1977. From 1979 to 1982, she studied Theoretical Linguistics at Essex University, Great Britain, where she earned an MA and a PhD on The Verb in Berber and The Syntax of the Complex Sentence in Berber, respectively.

== Career and research ==
Sadiqi is a Senior Professor of Linguistics and Gender Studies at Sidi Mohamed Ben Abdellah University in Fez. She taught syntax, morphology, phonology, gender studies, transnational feminisms and media. Sadiqi also taught at US universities such as the University of Mansfield in 2003, Harvard University in 2007, California State University at Pomona (2013-2014), and Visiting Professor, Gender Studies, Institute of Asian and Oriental Studies, University of Zurich. Sadiqi was a Woodrow Wilson Center Global Fellow (2015-2016).

Sadiqi’s specializations and research interests are:

- Gender and Women’s Studies in North Africa
- Transnational and global feminisms
- Berber Studies
- globalization and social change

== Publications ==
=== Main ===
- Daesh Ideology and Women's Legal Rights. Cambridge University Press. 2017.
- Moroccan Feminist Discourses. New York: Palgrave Macmillan. 2014.
- Images of Women in Abdullah Bashrahil's Poetry. Beirut: Arab Institute for Research and Publishing. 2004.
- Women, Gender, and Language in Morocco (2nd ed.). Brill Academic Publishers. 2009 [2003]. Largely acclaimed as the first international book on language and gender in the MENA region. Reviewed for various international and refereed journals such as Gender and language, International Sociology, Journal of Pragmatics, and International Studies.
- Grammaire du berbère (in French). Paris: L’Harmattan. 1997. (First grammar of its kind by a native speaker of the language.)
- Studies in Berber syntax. Germany: Königshaussen and Neumann. 1986.

=== Most recent academic articles ===
- ”The Big Absent in the Moroccan Feminist Movements: The Berber Dimension”. In North Africa Transition and Emerging Actors. Berber Movements. Anna Maria Di Tolla & Ersilia Francesca (eds.), Studi Maghrebini, "L'Orientale", 2017.
- ”The Moroccan Feminist Movement (1946-2014) (2017). In Balghis Badri & Aili Tripp (eds). Women's Activism in Africa: Struggles for Rights and Representation.
- ”A Genesis of Gender and Women’s Studies in Morocco” (2017). In Rita Stephan, and Mounira Charrad (Eds.) Women Rising. New York : New York University Press.
- ”Women’s Perceptions of Islam in Today’s Morocco”. Journal of Feminist Scholarship. Issue 11. Fall 2016.
- ”Emerging Amazigh Feminist Nongovernmental NGOs” Journal of Middle East Women’s Studies 2016. 12(1): 122-125.
- ”Feminization of Authority in Morocco” (2015). In Gender, Power, Democracy, edited by Mino Vianello and Mary Hawkesworth. 2014. New York: Palgrave Macmillan.
- ”Women’s Organizing in Morocco in Light of A Post-Arab Spring Moment and an Islamist Government” (2015). In Zeina Zaatari (ed.) Encyclopedia of Women and Islamic Cultures. Supplement XI. Political-Social Movements: Community Based.
- ”The Center: A New Post-Arab Spring Space for Women’s Rights” (2016). In Women’s Movements in the Post-“Arab Spring” North Africa. In F. Sadiqi, ed.
- “The Marginalization of Moroccan Women in Society and the Media” (2015). In Ennaji, M. ed. Minorities and Women in North Africa. Trenton: The Red Sea Press.
- “Berber and Language Politics in the Moroccan Educational System” (2014), in Moha Ennaji (ed) Multiculturalism and Democracy in North Africa. London: Routledge.
- “The Potential Within: Progressive Ijtihad in the Practice Moroccan Judges’ Adjudications on Shiqaq (discord) Divorce" (2013), in Elisa Ada Giunchi (ed) Adjucating Family Law in Muslim Courts.
- “Women’s NGOs and the Struggle for Democracy in Morocco” (2013), in Galia Golan and Walid Salem (eds) Non-State Actors in the Middle East. Factors for Peace and Democracy. London: Routledge.
- ”Women and Islam in Morocco” (2013), The Oxford Encyclopedia of Islam and Women.

=== International media articles ===
- “Gender at the Heart of the New Moroccan Constitution”. Article written for the Common Ground News. This article has been translated into several languages. September 6, 2011.
- “North African Women at the Forefront of Legal Reform”. Article written for the Common Ground News. This article has been translated into several languages. November 10, 2010.
- ”Morocco’s Veiled Feminists”. Article written for the Project Syndicate. This article has been translated into several languages. May 25, 2006.

== Media activities ==
- “Gender Equity and Islam”. Interviewed by Santorri Chamley. New African Magazine. June Issue, 2011.
- “Le FolEspoir des Berbères”. Part of a group of interviewees. Le Point Magazine. June 2, 2011.
- “La Méthode de Freedom House.” Jeune Afrique. March 23, 2010. Interview.
- “Morocco: Women’s Rights”. CNN documentary and interview. New York, June 30, 2009.
- ”Feminine Echos.”(In Arabic). Radio Médi 1. January 9, 2009.
- ”Family Law Changes in Morocco”. Interview. Every woman Program. Al Jazeera International. Doha (Qatar), March 7, 2008.
- ”How I became a Leading Voice for Moroccan Women”. Interviewed by Saundra Satterlee for the Guardian Weekly. London, January 4, 2008.
- ”Women’s Words. A Moroccan Scholar-Activist Links Language and Power”. Interviewed by Aimee Dowl. Ms Magazine. Summer Issue, 2007.
- Amazigh TV debate: discussion about Amazigh (Berber) Culture and Politics. March 2007.
- Radio debate: Islam and Feminism (with Amina Wadud from the US and Ziba Mir-Husseini from England). Amsterdam, May 19, 2005.
