= Western Egyptian Bedawi Arabic =

Arabic variety of Western Egypt

- Sahil Maryut Bedouin Arabic; Sulaimitian Arabic
- Native to: Egypt
- Region: Alexandria, Beheira, Matrouh, Beni Suef, Cairo, Egypt–Libya border
- Speakers: 1 million (2022)
- Language family: Afro-Asiatic: Semitic; West Semitic; Central Semitic; Arabic; Maghrebi Arabic; Libyan Arabic; Western Egyptian Bedawi Arabic
- Writing system: Arabic alphabet

Language codes
- ISO 639-3: ayl included in Libyan Arabic [ayl]
- Glottolog: west2774

Western Egyptian Bedawi Arabic, also known as Sahil Maryut Bedouin Arabic, is a group of Bedouin Arabic dialects spoken in Western Egypt along the Mediterranean coast, west to the Egypt–Libya border. Ethnologue and Glottolog classify Western Egyptian Bedawi Arabic as a Libyan Arabic dialect.

This variety is spoken by the Awlad Ali tribe, who settled in the edges of Lake Maryut and west of Bihera beginning in the 17th century from the region of Jebel Akhdar (Libya). It is also spoken in Wadi El Natrun. Their dialect is phonologically, morphophonemically and morphologically closer to the Peninsular Bedouin dialects than to the adjacent Egyptian dialects. Egyptian Arabic speakers from other parts of Egypt do not understand the Awlad Ali dialect.

Western Bedouin dialects influenced the dialects of southern Upper Egypt between Asyut and Idfu, and those of the Bahariyya Oasis and Bihera.

== Classification ==
The dialects spoken in Matruh province as well as in eastern Libya have been traditionally classified as belonging to the Sulaymi Bedouin dialects, characterized by a /g/ reflex of Qāf, the gahawa-syndrome, and feminine plural conjugations and pronouns. However, the classification of North African Bedouin dialects into Hilalian, Sulaimitian, and Ma’qilian groups is not uncontroversial, and is based primarily on socio-historical and geographical considerations. While the dialects of Tripolitania represent a continuation of Tunisian dialects, the dialects of Cyrenaica show affinities with Eastern Bedouin dialects, especially with regards to the gahawa-syndrome and syllable structure.

== Phonology ==
Consonants
		Labial	Interdental		Dental/Alveolar		Palatal	Velar	Pharyngeal	Glottal
		Labial	plain	emph.	plain	emph.	Palatal	Velar	Pharyngeal	Glottal
Nasal		m			n					
Stop	voiceless				t	tˤʔ		k		
Stop	voiced	b			d			ɡ		
Fricative	voiceless	f	θ		s	sˤ	ʃ	x	ħ	h
Fricative	voiced		ð	ðˤ	z		ʒ	ɣ	ʕ	
Tap/Trill					r					
Approximant					l		j	w		

Notes:

- /ṭ/ is glottalized as in Upper Egyptian Arabic: [tˤʔ]

Vowels
	Front	Central	Back
Close	i iː		uː
Mid		ə	
Open		a aː	

== Grammar ==
=== Pronouns ===
Contrary to MSA, Western Egyptian Bedawi uses the plural pronouns for dual pronouns:

Independent personal pronouns
		Singular	Plural
1st person (m/f)		nā, nābīdi	iḥna, niḥna
2nd person	m	init	intu
2nd person	f	inti	intan
3rd person	m	hū	həm
3rd person	f	hī	hin

The following direct object pronominal suffixes are attached to verbs:

Direct object pronominal suffixes
		Singular	Plural
1st person (m/f)		-ni	-na
2nd person	m	-ak	-kam
2nd person	f	-ik	-kan
3rd person	m	-ih, -ah (near emphatics)	-həm ~ -ham
3rd person	f	-ha	-hin ~ -hən

The following demonstrative pronouns are used. The form hāḏ̣ayīəhi is also used with the suffix -yīəhi:

Demonstrative pronouns
		Singular	Plural
Proximal (this, these)	m	hāḏ̣a	hāḏowl
Proximal (this, these)	f	hāḏi	hāḏeyn
Distal (that, those)	m	hāḏ̣āk	hāḏ̣alówk
Distal (that, those)	f	hāḏīk	hāḏ̣alák

The following interrogative pronouns are used:

Interrogative pronouns
Arabic	English
eyš	what
leyš	why
eymítta	when
weyn	where
keyf, eyšinhū, eyšinhī	how

=== Verbs ===
==== Perfect ====
There are two types of strong perfect stems, CiCáC (a-type) and CCiC (i-type). Examples of a-type perfects are misák, nizál, ṭiláʿ, fihám. Examples of i-type perfects are šrib, rkib, zʿil, smiʿ, ʿrif, gdir, kbir, kṯir, tʿib, lbis, ybis.

Some perfect conjugations are shown below:

		Base	w/ Object Suffixes
3rd person sg.	m	misák	
3rd person sg.	f	msíkat	msikīət-ih, msikát-ta
3rd person pl.	m	msíkaw	
3rd person pl.	f	msíkan	msikánn-ih

==== Imperfect ====
There are three types of strong imperfect stems, CCiC (i-type), CCəC (ə-type), and CCaC (a-type). The vowel of the conjugation prefix harmonizes with the vowel of the stem: yiktib, yərgəd, yašṛab. The conjugation of the 1st person follows the niktib-níkitbu paradigm.

== Influence ==
=== Bihera ===
The pronunciation [ʒ] for ǧīm occurs in the west of the Bihera, were Awlad Ali settled. Metathesized forms such as mašzid “mosque” may be a result of the influence of their dialect.

== Bibliography ==
- Al-Wer, Enam; Jong, Rudolf (2017). "Dialects of Arabic". In Boberg, Charles; Nerbonne, John; Watt, Dominic (eds.). The Handbook of Dialectology. Wiley. pp. 523–534. doi:10.1002/9781118827628.ch32. ISBN 978-1-118-82755-0. OCLC 989950951.
- Behnstedt, Peter; Woidich, Manfred (1987). Die ägyptisch-arabischen Dialekte: Texte. Delta-Dialekte (in German). Vol. 3. Reichert. ISBN 978-3-88226-415-9. OCLC 158521055.
- Behnstedt, Peter; Woidich, Manfred (2005). Arabische Dialektgeographie : eine Einführung (in German). Boston: Brill. ISBN 90-04-14130-8. OCLC 182530188.
- Ennaji, Moha (1998). Arabic varieties in North Africa. Centre for Advanced Studies of African Society. Florida Hills: Vivlia. ISBN 1-919799-12-5. OCLC 42746547.
- Holes, Clive, ed. (2018). Arabic Historical Dialectology: Linguistic and Sociolinguistic Approaches. Oxford University Press. ISBN 978-0-19-870137-8. OCLC 1059441655.
- Hüsken, Thomas (2019). "People, Places and a Brief History". Tribal Politics in the Borderland of Egypt and Libya. Cham: Springer International Publishing. pp. 31–59. doi:10.1007/978-3-319-92342-0_3. ISBN 978-3-319-92342-0. OCLC 1059513981. S2CID 165534196.
- Maṭar, ʻAbd al-ʻAzīz (1967). لهجة البدو في اقليم ساحل مريوط: دراسة لغوية [The Bedouin Dialect in Mariut Coast: A Linguistic Study] (in Arabic). دار الكاتب العربي،. OCLC 784347217.
- Maṭar, ʻAbd al-ʻAzīz (1981). لهجة البدو في الساحل الشمالي لجمهورية مصر العربية : دراسة لغوية [Bedouin dialect in the northern coast of the Arab Republic of Egypt: A linguistic study] (in Arabic). Dār al-Maʻārif, [Cairo]. ISBN 9789777334730. OCLC 60506275.
- Wilmsen, David; Woidich, Manfred (2011). "Egypt". In Edzard, Lutz; de Jong, Rudolf (eds.). Encyclopedia of Arabic Language and Linguistics. Brill. doi:10.1163/1570-6699_eall_EALL_COM_vol2_0001.
