= Libyan Arabic =

Dialect of the language as spoken in the North African country

- ليبي (Lībi)
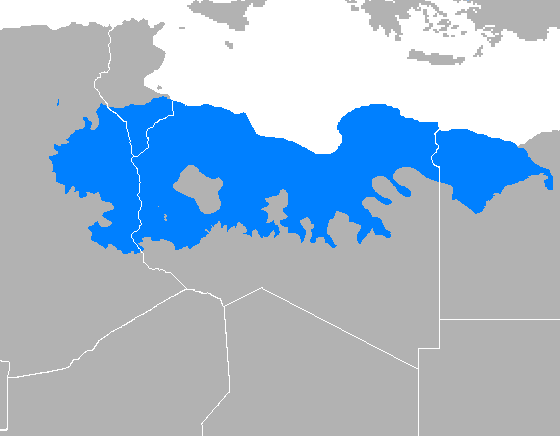
- Pronunciation: [ˈliːbi]
- Native to: Libya, Egypt, Niger
- Ethnicity: Arabs
- Speakers: 6.1 million (2020–2024)
- Language family: Afro-Asiatic: Semitic; West Semitic; Central Semitic; Arabic; Maghrebi; Libyan Arabic
- Dialects: Western Libyan Arabic; Eastern; Western Egyptian Bedawi; Judeo-Tripolitanian
- Writing system: Arabic script
- Signed forms: Libyan Sign

Language codes
- ISO 639-3: Either: ayl – Libyan Arabic yud – Judeo-Tripolitanian Arabic
- Glottolog: liby1240

Libyan Arabic (Arabic: ليبي, romanized: Lībī), also called Sulaimitian Arabic by scholars, is a variety of Arabic spoken in Libya, and neighboring countries. It can be divided into two major dialect areas: the eastern centred in Benghazi and Bayda, and the western centred in Tripoli and Misrata. The Eastern variety extends beyond the borders to the east and share the same dialect with far Western Egypt, Western Egyptian Bedawi Arabic, with 1 million speakers in Egypt. A distinctive southern variety, centered on Sabha, also exists and is more akin to the western variety. Another Southern dialect is also shared along the borders with Niger.

== Note on transcription notation ==
The transcription of Libyan Arabic into Latin script poses a few problems. The use of the International Phonetic Alphabet alone is not sufficient as it obscures some points that can be better understood if several different allophones in Libyan Arabic are transcribed using the same symbol.

Therefore, to make this article more legible, DIN 31635 is used with a few additions to render phonemes particular to Libyan Arabic. These additions are as follow:

| IPA | Extended DIN |
|---|---|
| ɡ | g/گ |
| oː | ō/او |
| eː | ē/اي |
| ə | ə/ايو |
| zˤ | ż/ظ |
| ʒ | j/ج |

== History ==
Two major historical events have shaped the Libyan dialect: the Hilalian-Sulaimi migration, and the migration of Arabs from al-Andalus to the Maghreb following the Reconquista. Libyan Arabic has also been influenced by Ancient Libyan, Greek and Italian, and to a lesser extent by Turkish. It contains a few Spanish loanwords which represent 6% of its vocabulary.

== Domains of use ==
The Libyan dialect is used predominantly in spoken communication in Libya. It is also used in Libyan folk poetry, TV dramas and comedies, songs, as well as in cartoons. Libyan Arabic is also used as a lingua franca by non-Arab Libyans whose mother tongue is not Arabic. Libyan Arabic is not normally written, as the written register is normally Modern Standard Arabic, but Libyan Arabic is the main language for cartoonists, and the only suitable language for writing Libyan folk poetry. It is also written in internet forums, emails and in instant messaging applications.

== Phonology ==
As is the case with all Bedouin dialects and some Urban dialects, the /q/ sound of Modern Standard Arabic is realized as a [ɡ], except sometimes in words recently borrowed from literary Arabic.

The following table shows the consonants used in Libyan Arabic. Note: some sounds occur in certain regional varieties while being completely absent in others.

Libyan Arabic consonant phonemes
| | | Labial | | Interdental | | Dental/Alveolar | | Palatal | Velar | Uvular | Pharyngeal | Glottal |
| | | plain | emphatic | plain | emphatic | plain | emphatic | Palatal | Velar | Uvular | Pharyngeal | Glottal |
|---|---|---|---|---|---|---|---|---|---|---|---|---|
| Nasal | | m | mˤ | | | n | | | | | | |
| Stops | voiceless | | | | | t | tˤ | | k | (q) | | (ʔ) |
| Stops | voiced | b | | | | d | dˤ | | ɡ | | | |
| Fricative | voiceless | f | | θ | | s | sˤ | ʃ | | χ | ħ | h |
| Fricative | voiced | (v) | | ð | (ðˤ) | z | zˤ | ʒ | | ʁ | ʕ | |
| Trill | | | | | | r | rˤ | | | | | |
| Approximant | | | | | | l | lˤ | j | w | | | |

In western dialects, the interdental fricatives /θ ð ðˤ/ have merged with the corresponding dental stops /t d dˤ/. Eastern dialects generally still distinguish the two sets, but there is a tendency to replace /dˤ/ with /ðˤ/.

Libyan Arabic vowel phonemes
| | Front | Central | Back |
|---|---|---|---|
| Close | iː | | uː |
| Near-close | ɪ | | ʊ |
| Mid | eː | | oː |
| Open | ă | aː | |

/ă/ is heard as [ɛ] in unstressed closed syllables. /aː/ is heard as [ɑ] before and after velar consonants and as [æː] in free variation before non-velar consonants. /ɪ/ phonetically occurs as a more central near-close sound [ɨ̞].

The e and o vowels exist only in long form. This can be explained by the fact that these vowels were originally diphthongs in Classical Arabic with /eː/ replacing /ai/ and /oː/ replacing /au/. In some eastern varieties, however, the classical /ai/ has changed to /ei/ and /au/ to /ou/.

Libyan Arabic has at least three clicks, which are used interjectionally, a trait shared with the Bedouin dialects of central Arabia. The first is used for affirmative responses and is generally considered very casual and sometimes associated with low social status. The second is a dental click and used for negative responses and is similar to the English 'tut'. The third is a palatal click used exclusively by women having a meaning close to that of the English word 'alas'.

=== Syllable structure ===
Although Western Libyan Arabic allows for the following syllable structure to occur.

syllable: C_{1}(C_{2})V_{1}(V_{2})(C_{3})(C_{4})
(C = consonant, V = vowel, optional components are in parentheses.)

An anaptyctic [ə] is inserted between C_{3} and C_{4} to ease pronunciation, changing the structure above into the following.

C_{1}(C_{2})V_{1}(V_{2})(C_{3})(əC_{4}).

On the other hand, Eastern Libyan always has an anaptyctic ə between C_{1} and C_{2} in the following manner.

C_{1}(əC_{2})V_{1}(V_{2})(C_{3})(C_{4}).

== Vocabulary ==
Most of the vocabulary in Libyan Arabic is of Old Arabic origin, usually with a modified interconsonantal vowel structure. Many Italian loanwords also exist, in addition to Turkish, Berber, Spanish, and English words.

=== Relation to Classical Arabic vocabulary ===
The bulk of vocabulary in Libyan Arabic has the same meaning as in Classical Arabic. However, many words have different but related meanings to those of Classical Arabic. The following table serves to illustrate this relation. The past tense is used in the case of verbs as it is more distinctive and has been traditionally used in Arabic lexicons. Canonically, these verbs are pronounced with the final 'a' (marker of the past tense in Classical Arabic). This notation is preserved the table below. However, the relation between Libyan and Classical Arabic verbs can be better understood if the final 'a' is dropped, in accordance with the elision rule of pre-pause vowels of Classical Arabic.

Comparison of meanings between Libyan Arabic words and Classical Arabic words
| Libyan Arabic | | | Classical Arabic | | |
| Word1 | IPA^{1} | Meaning | Word | IPA | Closest Meaning |
|---|---|---|---|---|---|
| xbaħ | ʃbaħ | (3rd m.) saw (perceived with the eyes) | šabaḥ | ʃabaħa | appeared vaguely |
| dwe | dwe | (3rd m.) spoke | dawā | dawaː | rumbled |
| loħ | loːħ | wood | lawḥ | lauħ | board, plank |
| wagħar | wɑːʕər | difficult | waʿr | waʕr | rough terrain |
| xaħħat | ʃaħːətˤ | (3rd m. trans.) stretched | šaḥiṭ | ʃaħitˤɑ | became distant |
| ħox | ħoːʃ | house | ḥawš | ħawʃ | enclosure |

1. Western Libyan pronunciation is used in the above table.

=== Italian loanwords ===
Italian loanwords exist mainly, but not exclusively, as a technical jargon. For example, machinery parts, workshop tools, electrical supplies, names of fish species, etc.

Italian Loanwords
| Libyan Arabic | | | Italian | |
| Word | IPA | Meaning | Word | Meaning |
|---|---|---|---|---|
| ŝaliťa | sˤɑːliːtˤa | slope | salita | up slope |
| marxabēdi | marʃa'beːdi | sidewalk | marciapiede | sidewalk |
| kinxellu | kənʃeːlːu | metallic gate | cancello | gate |
| anglu | aŋɡuli | corner | angolo | corner |
| ťanťa, ûťanťa | tˤɑːntˤɑ, utˤɑːntˤɑ | truck | ottanta | eighty (a model of a truck of Italian make) |
| tiesta | teːsta | a head butt | testa | head |

=== Turkish loanwords ===
Turkish words were borrowed during the Ottoman era of Libya. Words of Turkish origin are not as common as Italian ones.

Turkish Loanwords
| Libyan Arabic | | | Turkish | |
| Word | IPA | Meaning | Word | Meaning |
|---|---|---|---|---|
| kāšīk | kaːʃiːk | spoon | kaşık | spoon |
| šīša | ʃiːʃa | bottle | şişe | bottle |
| kāġəṭ | kɑːʁətˤ | paper | kâğıt | paper |
| šōg | ʃoːɡ | plenty of | çok | plenty of |
| doš | doʃ | shower | duş | shower |
| tunjra | tunʒra | pot | tencere | saucepan |

=== Berber loanwords ===
Before the mass Arabization of what corresponds to modern-day Libya, Berber was the native language for most people. This led to the borrowing of a number of Berber words in Libyan Arabic. Some examples of the Berber words in Libyan Arabic are Sardouk, fallous, kusha, garjuta, shlama, karmous, zemmita, bazin, kusksi, and zukra.

== Grammar ==
Libyan Arabic shares the feature of the first person singular initial n- with the rest of the Maghrebi Arabic dialect continuum to which it belongs. Like other colloquial Arabic dialects, Libyan does not mark grammatical cases by declension. However, it has a rich verbal conjugation structure.

=== Nouns ===
Nouns in Libyan Arabic are marked for two grammatical genders, termed masculine and feminine, and three grammatical numbers, singular, dual and plural. Paucal number also exists for some nouns. The diminutive is also still widely used productively (especially by women) to add an endearing or an empathetic connotation to the original noun. As in Classical Arabic, rules for the diminutive formation are based on vowel apophony.

Indefiniteness is not marked. Definite nouns are marked using the Arabic definite article but with somewhat different rules of pronunciation:

- For nouns beginning with "moon" letters, the definite article is pronounced either [l], for words with an initial single consonant onset, or [lə], for words with a double consonant onset. Except for the letter j /ʒ/, moon letters in Libyan Arabic are the same as in Classical Arabic even for letters that have become different phonemes such as q changing to g. The letter j /ʒ/, which corresponds to the Modern Standard Arabic phoneme /dʒ/, has changed from a moon letter to a sun letter.
- For nouns beginning with sun letters, which, in Libyan Arabic, include the letter j /ʒ/, the definite article is pronounced [ə], with the first consonant geminated.

==== Dual ====
While marking verbs for the dual number has been lost completely in Libyan Arabic as in other Arabic varieties, nouns have a specialized dual number form. However, in Eastern Libyan it tends to be more widespread.

==== Demonstratives ====
Various sets of demonstratives exist in Libyan Arabic. Following is a list of some of these. The grouping in columns does not necessarily reflect grouping in reality:

| Category | Demonstr. | IPA | Demonstr. | IPA | Demonstr. | IPA | Demonstr. | IPA | Demonstr. | IPA |
|---|---|---|---|---|---|---|---|---|---|---|
| this (Masc. sg.) | hāda | haːda | hādaya | haːdaja | hida | həda | haẓa | hɑðˤɑ | haẓayēhi | hɑðˤɑjːeːhi |
| this (fem. sg.) | hādi | haːdi | hādiya | haːdija | hidi | hədi | haẓi | hɑðˤi | haẓiyēhi | hɑðˤijːeːhi |
| that (masc. sg.) | hādāka | haːdaːka | hāḍākaya | haːdˤaːkaja | haḍak | hadˤaːk | haẓakki | hɑðˤakki | | |
| that (fem. sg.) | hādīka | haːdiːka | hādīkaya | haːdiːkaja | hadīk | hadiːk | | | | |

=== Verbs ===
Similar to Classical Arabic stem formation is an important morphological aspect of Libyan Arabic. However, stems III and X are unproductive whereas stems IV and IX do not exist. The following table shows Classical Arabic stems and their Libyan Arabic counterparts.

Verbal Stem Formation in Libyan Arabic^{1}
| | Classical Arabic | Libyan Arabic | Status |
| | Past (3rd sg. masc.) | Past (3rd sg. masc.) | Status |
|---|---|---|---|
| I | faʿala | fʿal | Productive |
| II | faʿʿala | faʿʿəl | Productive |
| III | fāʿala | fāʿəl | Unproductive |
| IV | ʾafʿala | Does not Exist | |
| V | tafaʿʿala | tfaʿʿəl | Productive |
| VI | tafāʿala | tfāʿəl | Fairly productive. (usually in verbs that allow for reciprocity of action) |
| VII | infaʿala | ənfʿal | Productive |
| VIII | iftaʿala | əftʿal | Possible innovation in Libyan Arabic. The general meaning of the stem is the same as that of stem VII and does not correspond to the Classical Arabic meaning of the same stem. It is used when the initial of the triliteral of the verb begins with some sonorant like l, n, m, r. If stem VII were used with the sonorants mentioned above, the n in the stem would assimilate into the sonorant. |
| IX | ifʿalla | Does not Exist | |
| X | istafʿala | stafʿəl | Unproductive (Rare) |

Tripoli dialect is used in the table above

==== Conjugation ====
Like Classical Arabic and other Arabic dialects, Libyan Arabic distinguishes between two main categories of roots: strong roots (those that do not have vowels or hamza) and weak roots.

===== Conjugation of strong roots =====
Strong roots follow more predictable rules of conjugation, and they can be classified into three categories for Stem I in Western Libyan Arabic:

- i-verbs (e.g. k-t-b to write) follow an interconsonantal vowel structure that is predominated by an i (normally pronounced [ə])
- a-verbs (e.g. r-k-b to mount, to ascend) follow an interconsonantal vowel structure that is predominated by an a
- u-verbs (e.g. r-g-ṣ to dance) follow an interconsonantal vowel structure that is predominated by an u

This classification is not always strictly followed. For example, the third person feminine past of the root r-g-d, which is a u-verb, is usually pronounced [rəɡdət], instead of [ruɡdət]. Also, a-verbs and u-verbs follow the same rules in the past conjugation.

Libyan Arabic triliteral i-verb^{1,2} morphology for the root k-t-b (to write) Stem I Tripoli Dialect
| Person | Past | Present | Imperative |
Singular
| 3rd (m.) | ktab | yiktəb | Not Applicable |
| 3rd (f.) | kitbət | tiktəb | Not Applicable |
| 2nd (m.) | ktabət | tiktəb | iktəb |
| 2nd (f.) | ktabti | tikətbi | ikətbi |
| 1st | ktabət | niktəb | Not Applicable |
Plural
| 3rd (m and f) | kitbu | yikətbu | Not Applicable |
| 2nd (m and f) | ktabtu | tikətbu | ikətbu |
| 1st (m and f) | ktabna | nikətbu | Not Applicable |

1. The i in an i-verb is usually pronounced [ə].
2. In roots with initial uvular, pharyngeal and glottal phonemes (χ ħ h ʁ ʕ ʔ but not q), i in the present and imperative is pronounced [e]. For example, the root ʁ-l-b (to overcome) is conjugated as jeʁləb, teʁləb, etc.

Libyan Arabic triliteral a-verb^{1} morphology for the root r-k-b (to mount, to ascend) Stem I Tripoli Dialect
| Person | Past | Present | Imperative |
Singular
| 3rd (m.) | rkab | yarkəb | Not Applicable |
| 3rd (f.) | rukbət | tarkəb | Not Applicable |
| 2nd (m.) | rkabət | tarkəb | arkəb |
| 2nd (f.) | rkabti | tarkbi | arkbi |
| 1st | rkabət | narkəb | Not Applicable |
Plural
| 3rd (m and f) | rukbu | yarkbu | Not Applicable |
| 2nd (m and f) | rkabtu | tarkbu | arkbu |
| 1st (m and f) | rkabna | narkbu | Not Applicable |

1.Realized variously as a and ɑ depending on the consonant structure of the word.

Libyan Arabic triliteral u-verb^{1} morphology for the root r-g-ṣ (to dance) Stem I Tripoli Dialect
| Person | Past | Present | Imperative |
Singular
| 3rd (m.) | rgaṣ | yurguṣ | Not Applicable |
| 3rd (f.) | rugṣət | turguṣ | Not Applicable |
| 2nd (m.) | rgaṣət | turguṣ | urguṣ |
| 2nd (f.) | rgaṣti | turgṣi | urgṣi |
| 1st | rgaṣət | nurguṣ | Not Applicable |
Plural
| 3rd (m and f) | rugṣu | yurgṣu | Not Applicable |
| 2nd (m and f) | rgaṣtu | turgṣu | urgṣu |
| 1st (m and f) | rgaṣna | nurgṣu | Not Applicable |

1. In roots with initial uvular, pharyngeal or glottal phonemes (χ ħ h ʁ ʕ ʔ but not q), u, in the present and the imperative, is realised by o. For example, the root ʁ-r-f (to scoop up) is conjugated as joʁrəf, toʁrəf, etc.

Conjugation in the Eastern Libyan Arabic is more fine grained, yielding a richer structure.

=== Future tense ===
Future in Libyan Arabic is formed by prefixing an initial bi, usually contracted to b, to the present tense conjugation. Thus, 'tiktəb' (she writes) becomes 'btiktəb' (she will write). It should not be confused with the indicative marker common in some Eastern Arabic varieties.

== Intelligibility with other varieties of Arabic ==
Western Libyan Arabic of Tripolitania and Fezzan is a bit intelligible to Tunisians and to a small extent to eastern Algerians. However, for Egyptian and Middle Eastern Arabic speakers, Libyan Arabic is extremely difficult to understand as it is a Maghrebi dialect influenced by Italian, Latin, Turkish, and ancient Libyan words.

On occasion, Libyans replace some Libyan words with Modern Standard or Egyptian Arabic words to make themselves understood to other Arabic speakers, especially those from the Middle East. The following table shows some of the commonly replaced words:

| Libyan Arabic | IPA | Meaning | Common Replacements |
|---|---|---|---|
| halba | halba | plenty | ktīr |
| dār | daːr | (he) did | ʕemel |
| dwe | dwe | (he) spoke | gāl |
| gaʿmiz | ɡaʕməz | (he) sat | gʕad |
| ngaz, naggez | ŋɡaz | (he) jumped | nɑṭṭ |
| Kḫnab | χnab | (he) stole | srag |

Generally, all Italian and to few extent Turkish loanwords are substituted.

If a word is replaced, it does not mean that it is exclusively Libyan. The situation sometimes arises because the speaker mistakenly guesses that the word does not exist in the hearer's dialect. For example, the word zarda (feast, picnic) has close variants in other Maghrebi dialects but is usually substituted in Maghrebi contexts because most speakers do not know that such variants exist.

== Pidgin Libyan Arabic ==
Pidgin Libyan exists in Libya as a contact language used by non-Arabs, mostly Saharan and sub-Saharan Africans living in Libya. Like other pidgins, it has a simplified structure and limited expressive power.

== See also ==
- Transliteration of Libyan placenames
- Varieties of Arabic
- Maghrebi Arabic
- Tunisian Arabic
- Algerian Arabic
- Moroccan Arabic
