= Eastern Libyan Arabic =

Dialect of Arabic spoken in Eastern Libya

- Cyrenaican Arabic
- ليبي شرقي
- Native to: Cyrenaica, eastern Libya
- Ethnicity: Arabs
- Language family: Afro-Asiatic: Semitic; West Semitic; Central Semitic; Arabic; Maghrebi Arabic; Libyan Arabic; Eastern Libyan Arabic
- Dialects: Western Egyptian Bedawi Arabic
- Writing system: Arabic script

Language codes
- ISO 639-3: ayl
- Glottolog: east2691

Eastern Libyan Arabic (Arabic: ليبي شرقي) or Cyrenaican Arabic is a variety of Libyan Arabic spoken in the Cyrenaica region of eastern Libya. The variety is centred in Benghazi and Bayda and extends beyond the borders to the east and shares the same dialect with western Egypt, Western Egyptian Bedawi Arabic, with between 90,000 and 474,000 speakers in Egypt. It is considered a nomadic Sulaymi subdialect of the Hilalian dialects.

== Phonology ==
Differences between Eastern and Western Libyan Arabic can particularly be found in phonology. ⟨ذ⟩ /ð/ is mainly pronounced as [ð] in Eastern, whereas it is mostly pronounced as [d] in the Western dialect. ⟨ث⟩ /θ/ is mainly [θ] in Benghazi and mainly [t] in Tripoli.

== Sociolinguistic features ==
Due to broadcasting power, Western Libyan Arabic of Tripoli is understood by the majority of the Libyan population who live on the coast, and therefore Western Libyan Arabic represents "Libyan Arabic" on the wider regional stage at the expense of Eastern Libyan Arabic.
