= Language Attitudes Among Arabic-French Bilinguals in Morocco =

1983 book by Abdelâli Bentahila

- Author: Abdelâli Bentahila
- Publication date: 1983
- ISBN: 978-0905028156

Language Attitudes among Arabic–French Bilinguals in Morocco (ISBN 978-0905028156) is a 1983 book by Abdelâli Bentahila, published by the Clevedon company of Avon, England. The book discusses Arabic-French bilingualism in Morocco.

The author was a Moroccan linguist who, after receiving his PhD, began teaching in the city of Fes (Fez) in Morocco. The book focused on "balanced bilinguals" who attended bilingual secondary schools and/or universities.

In the book Bentahila argued that the Moroccan officials do not consult their people on the language planning issue and therefore do not find success with their language planning. He also concludes that the bilingual Moroccans who establish the education system believe both Classical Arabic and French have an important role in Morocco's development and their own lives, and therefore they are highly loyal to both languages.

As part of his research, Bentahila collected data from 432 Moroccans, aged 17 to the late 30s who had been educated in both Arabic and French. His subjects included clerks, secretaries, students, and teachers.

== Contents ==
The book has seven chapters. The initial portion of the book discusses the history of the languages of instruction in the Moroccan school system from the pre-colonial through post-colonial periods. The next portion involves the author discussing the results of his questionnaire. and includes a survey of the literature about the language situation from inside and outside the Maghreb. The book has a chapter about comparative attitudes towards Moroccan Arabic, Classical Arabic, and French. There is also a chapter on language planning in Morocco.

== Reception ==
Paul B. Stevens of the Journal of Language and Social Psychology said that it was the first book-length work on bilingualism in North Africa written in the English language, and for writing the book Bentahila "is to be applauded on several counts." He said "Taken as a whole, Bentahila's book is a worthwhile one and, some of the remarks which follow notwithstanding, it deserved to be read."

Brian Weinstein of the Journal of Multilingual and Multicultural Development wrote that the book is "an important addition to the literature on language attitudes" and that it "also is valuable methodologically and for the implicit and explicit suggestions for further research into attitudes and their relationship to social change or social stagnation."

== See also ==
- French language in Morocco
- Languages of Morocco
