= Judeo-Tripolitanian Arabic =

Judeo-Arabic variety of Libya

- Libyan Judeo-Arabic; Tripolitanian Judeo-Arabic; Jewish Tripolitanian-Libyan Arabic; Tripolita'it; Yudi
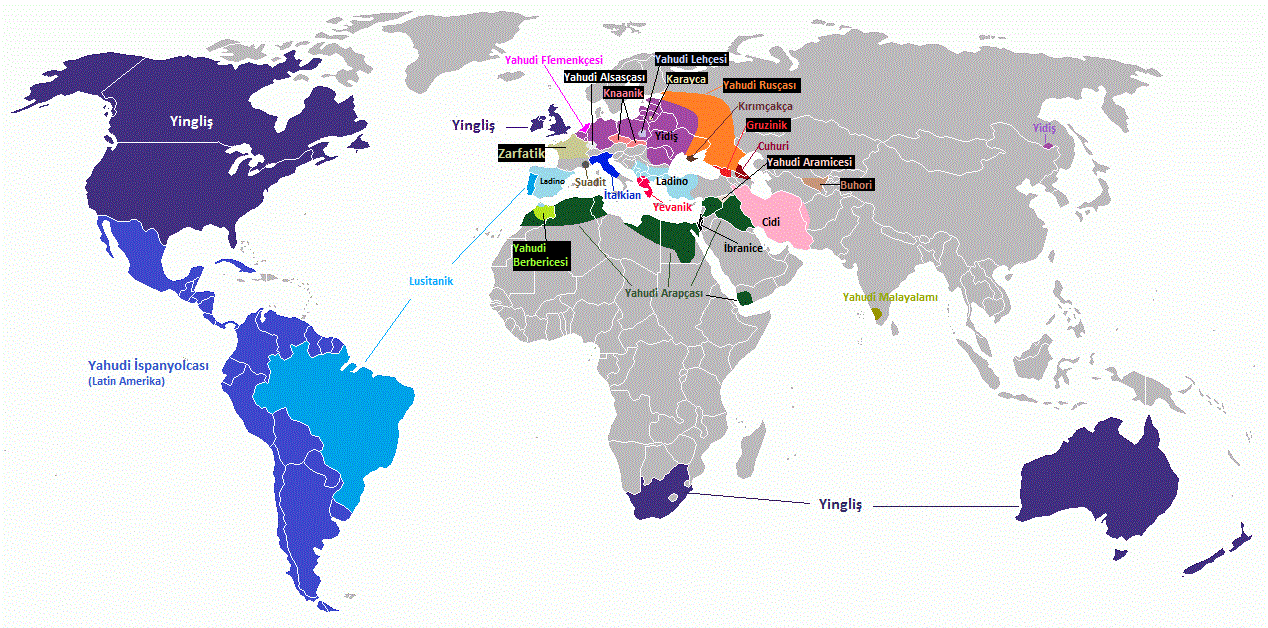
- Native to: Israel, Italy
- Native speakers: (43,000 cited 1994–1994)
- Language family: Afro-Asiatic: Semitic; Central Semitic; Arabic; Maghrebi; Pre-Hilalian; Libyan; Judeo-Tripolitanian Arabic
- Writing system: Hebrew alphabet

Language codes
- ISO 639-3: yud
- Glottolog: jude1264
- ELP: Judeo-Tripolitanian Arabic

Judeo-Tripolitanian Arabic (also known as Tripolitanian Judeo-Arabic, Jewish Tripolitanian–Libyan Arabic, Tripolita'it, Yudi) is a variety of Arabic spoken by Jews formerly living in Libya.

Judeo-Tripolitanian Arabic differs from standard Libyan Arabic in that it closely resembles the original dialect of the sedentary population, whereas much of Libya's population now speaks Bedouin-influenced varieties of Arabic. A reference grammar is available.

The vast majority of Libyan Jews have relocated to Israel and have switched to using Hebrew in as their first language. Those in Italy typically use Italian as their first language.

== Phonology ==
Judeo-Tripolitanian Arabic contains 31 consonant phonemes which are as follows:

Nasals	Plosives	Affricative	Fricatives	Liquids	Rhotic	Semi-Vowels
m, n, (ŋ)	b, (t), d, (tˤ), g, k, q, ʔ	t͡ʃ, d͡ʒ	f, s, z, sˤ, ʃ, x,. ħ, ʕ, h	l, (lˤ)	ɣ	w, j

It also has 4 Vowels which are as follows:

Front Vowels	Back Vowels
i, (e)	a, ə, o, (u)

== Morphology ==
=== Pronouns ===
==== Independent Pronouns ====
	Singular	Plural
1st	ʔaná	ħnán
2nd Male	nt͡ʃá	nt͡ʃə́mm
2nd Female	nt͡ʃí	
3rd Male	ʔáwwa	ʔə́mma
3rd Female	ʔə́jja	

==== Pronoun suffixes ====
	Singular			Plural
	After consonant	After vowel	After semivowel	Plural
1st	-i (-ni)	-ya (-ni)		
2nd	-ək	-k		-kəm
3rd Male		+ stress and length -u (followed by consonant)	-(w)ú, (y)i	-əm
3rd Female	-a			

== Demographics ==
In ca. 1994 there were 35,000 speakers of Judeo-Tripolitanian Arabic, mostly in Israel (30,000) and Italy (5,000). As of 2014, those in Israel are mostly over the age of 60 and are bilingual in Hebrew.

== History ==
There were 20,000 Jews living in Tripoli, Libya in 1948. About 14,000 migrated to Israel and Italy in 1948–1952, following two riots. After riots during the Six-Day War in 1967, most of the remaining 6,000 Jews emigrated; there were only a few dozen Jews living in Tripoli in 1970.

== See also ==
- History of the Jews in Libya
- Jewish languages
- Judeo-Arabic languages
