= Voiceless dental fricative =

Consonantal sound represented by ⟨θ⟩ in IPA

θ
- IPA number: 130

Audio sample
- source · help

Encoding
- Entity (decimal): &#952;
- Unicode (hex): U+03B8
- X-SAMPA: T
- Braille: ⠨ (braille pattern dots-46) ⠹ (braille pattern dots-1456)
Image

A voiceless dental non-sibilant fricative is a type of consonantal sound used in some spoken languages. It is familiar to most English-speakers as the ⟨th⟩ sound in think.

Though rather rare as a phoneme among the world's languages, it is encountered in some of the most widespread and influential ones. The symbol in the International Phonetic Alphabet that represents this sound is ⟨θ⟩. The IPA symbol is the lowercase Greek letter theta, which is used for this sound in post-classical Greek, and the sound is thus often referred to as "theta".

Dental non-sibilant fricatives (this sound and its voiced counterpart) are often called "interdental" because they are often produced with the tongue between the upper and lower teeth, and not just against the back of the upper or lower teeth, as they are with other dental consonants.

Speakers of languages and dialects without the sound sometimes have difficulty producing or distinguishing it from similar sounds, especially if they have had no chance to acquire it in childhood, and typically replace it with a voiceless alveolar fricative /s/, voiceless dental stop /t/, or a voiceless labiodental fricative /f/; known respectively as th-alveolarization, th-stopping, and th-fronting.

These sounds are known to have disappeared from a number of languages, e.g. from most of the Germanic languages or dialects, where it is retained only in Scots, English, and Icelandic, but it is alveolar in the last of these. Among non-Germanic Indo-European languages as a whole, the sound was also once much more widespread, but is today preserved in a few languages including the Brythonic languages, Peninsular Spanish, Galician, Venetian, Tuscan, Albanian, some Occitan dialects and Greek. It has likewise disappeared from many modern vernacular varieties of Arabic, like Egyptian Arabic. Standard Arabic, and various dialects like Mesopotamian Arabic still retain the sound and its voiced counterpart /ð/. Similarly in Spanish, /θ/ is present in the Iberian (peninsular) standard pronunciation of ⟨z, ce, ci⟩, but absent in several dialects of Andalusian, Canarian, and Hispanic America as a whole.

On the other hand, there are a very few languages, including Turkmen and Standard Zhuang, where these sounds have replaced /s/ and are even spelled with ⟨s⟩ or its orthographic equivalent.

== Features ==
Sagittal section of a voiceless dental fricative

Features of a voiceless dental non-sibilant fricative:

- Its manner of articulation is fricative, which means it is produced by constricting air flow through a narrow channel at the place of articulation, causing turbulence. It does not have the grooved tongue and directed airflow, or the high frequencies, of a sibilant.
- Its place of articulation is dental, which means it is articulated with either the tip or the blade of the tongue at the upper teeth, termed respectively apical and laminal. Note that most stops and liquids described as dental are actually denti-alveolar.
- Its phonation is voiceless, which means it is produced without vibrations of the vocal cords. In some languages the vocal cords are actively separated, so it is always voiceless; in others the cords are lax, so that it may take on the voicing of adjacent sounds.
- It is an oral consonant, which means that air is not allowed to escape through the nose.
- It is a median consonant, which means it is produced by directing the airstream down the midline of the tongue, rather than to the sides.
- Its airstream mechanism is pulmonic, which means it is articulated by pushing air only with the intercostal muscles and abdominal muscles, as in most speech sounds.

== Occurrence ==
Language		Word	IPA	Meaning	Notes
Albanian		thotë	[θɔtə]	'says'	
Arabic	Modern Standard	ثَوْب	[θawb]	'a dress'	Represented by ⟨ث⟩. See Arabic phonology.
Arabic	Eastern Libyan	ثِلاثة	[θɪˈlæːθæ]	'three'	
Arabic	Sanʽani	يِثَمَّن	[jɪˈθæmːæn]	'it is priced'	
Arabic	Iraqi	ثمانْية	[θ(ɪ)ˈmæːnjæ]	'eight'	
Arabic	Khuzestani	الثانْية	[ɪθˈθæːnjæ]	'the second one'	
Aragonese		arbuzo	[arˈbuθo]	'bush'	
Arapaho		yoo3on	[jɔːθɔn]	'five'	
Arpitan	Genevan and Savoyard	marchiê	[maʁθˈia]	'market'	
Arpitan	Fribourgeois	èthêla	[eˈθɛːla]	'star'	
Arpitan	Valaisan	cllâf	[θo]	'key'	Limited to L'Étivaz (VD), Bourg-Saint-Pierre (VS), and a few other villages.
Assyrian		ܒܝܬܐ bèṭa	[beːθa]	'house'	Mostly used in the Western, Barwari, Tel Keppe, Batnaya and Alqosh dialects; realized as [t] in other varieties.
Asturian		zusmiu	[ˈθusmju]	'juice'	
Avestan		𐬑𐬱𐬀𐬚𐬭𐬀 xšaθra	[xʃaθra]	'kingdom'	
Bashkir		дуҫ / duθ	[duθ]	'friend'	
Berber		Ṯmaziɣṯ	[θmæzɪɣθ]	'Berber' (language)	This pronunciation is common in northern Morocco, central Morocco, and northern Algeria.
Berta		[θɪ́ŋɑ̀]		'to eat'	
Burmese		သုံး / thon:	[θòʊ̯̃]	'three'	Commonly realized as an affricate [t̪͡θ].
Bengali		থ়ওয়াব	[θɔwɐb]	ˈreward'	Only occurs in loanwords. See Bengali phonology
Catalan	Most dialects	theta	[ˈθetə]	'theta'	Can be replaced by /s/ in Spanish names and loanwords. See Catalan phonology
Catalan	Some Aragonese speakers	cinc	[ˈθiŋk]	'five'	Corresponds to /s/ and /z/ in other varieties. See Catalan phonology
Cornish		eth	[eːθ]	'eight'	
Emiliano-Romagnol		fâza	[ˈfaːθɐ]	'face'	
English	Most dialects	thin	[θɪn]	'thin'	See English phonology
Galician	Most dialects	cero	[ˈθɛɾʊ]	'zero'	Merges with /s/ into [s] in Western dialects. See Galician phonology
Greek		θάλασσα	[ˈθalasa]	'sea'	See Modern Greek phonology
Gweno		[riθo]		'eye'	
Gwich’in		thał	[θaɬ]	'pants'	
Halkomelem		θqet	[θqet]	'tree'	
Hän		nihthän	[nihθɑn]	'I want'	
Harsusi		[θəroː]		'two'	
Hebrew	Iraqi	עברית	[ʕibˈriːθ]	'Hebrew' (language)	See Modern Hebrew phonology
Hebrew	Yemenite	עברית	[ʕivˈriːθ]	'Hebrew' (language)	See Modern Hebrew phonology
Hlai	Basadung	[θsio]		'one'	
Icelandic		þing	[θiŋk]	'thing' (assembly)	
Italian	Tuscan	i capitani	[iˌhäɸiˈθäːni]	'the captains'	Intervocalic allophone of /t/. See Italian phonology and Tuscan gorgia
Kabyle		ṯafaṯ	[θafaθ]	'light' (noun)	
Karen	Sgaw	သၢ	[θə˧]	'three'	
Karuk		yiθa	[jiθa]	'one'	
Kickapoo		neθwi	[nɛθwi]	'three'	
Kwama		[mɑ̄ˈθíl]		'to laugh'	
Leonese		ceru	[θeɾu]	'zero'	
Lorediakarkar		[θar]		'four'	
Malay		Selasa	[θəlaθa]	'Tuesday'	Mostly occurs in Arabic loanwords originally containing this sound, but the writing is not distinguished from the Arabic loanwords with the [s] sound and this sound must be learned separately by the speakers. See Malay phonology.
Massa		[faθ]		'five'	
Occitan	Gascon	macipon	[maθiˈpu]	'(male) child'	Limited the sub-dialects of the region of Castillonais, in the Ariège department.
Occitan	Vivaro-Alpine	chin	[θĩ]	'dog'	Limited to Vénosc, in the Isère department.
Old Persian		𐎧𐏁𐎠𐎹𐎰𐎡𐎹 xšāyaθiya	[xʃaːjaθija]	'king'	Does not occur in modern Persian.
Portuguese		Théo	[ˈθɛw]	'Theo'	Allophone of /tʰ/. See Portuguese phonology
Saanich		TÁŦES	[teθʔəs]	'eight'	
Sardinian	Nuorese	petha	[pɛθa]	'meat'	
Scottish Gaelic	Tayinloan and Jura	sruthan	[θɾuʔan]	'stream'	Dialectal allophone of /s̪/ before /ɾ/ in certain Argyll dialects.
Shark Bay		[θar]		'four'	
Shawnee		nthwi	[nθwɪ]	'three'	
Sioux	Nakoda	ktusa	[ktũˈθa]	'four'	Varies with [s].
Spanish	European	cazar	[käˈθ̪͆äɾ]	'to hunt'	Interdental. See Spanish phonology and Seseo. This sound is not contrastive in the Americas, southern Andalusia or the Canary Islands.
Spanish	Castilian	pared	[paˈɾeθ]	'wall'	Word-final, especially in Madrid. Corresponds to [ð] in standard Spanish.
Swahili		thamini	[θɑˈmini]	'value'	Mostly occurs in Arabic loanwords originally containing this sound.
Tanacross		thiit	[θiːtʰ]	'embers'	
Toda		[wɨnboθ]		'nine'	
Turkmen		sen	[θɛn]	'you'	Realization of the /z/ phoneme
Tutchone	Northern	tho	[θo]	'pants'	
Tutchone	Southern	thü	[θɨ]	'pants'	
Upland Yuman	Havasupai	[θerap]		'five'	
Upland Yuman	Hualapai	[θarap]		'five'	
Upland Yuman	Yavapai	[θerapi]		'five'	
Venetian	Eastern dialects	çinque	[ˈθiŋkwe]	'five'	Corresponds to /s/ in other dialects.
Wolaytta		shiththa	[ɕiθθa]	'flower'	
Welsh		saith	[saiθ]	'seven'	
Zhuang		saw	[θaːu˨˦]	'language'	
Zotung	Standard dialect of Lungngo	kacciade	[kəˈθʲaːðɛ]	'I go'	Realized as [sʲ] and [t] in Aikap and other Northern dialects. It can also be voiced depending on the preceding consonant.

=== Voiceless dental approximant ===
Voiceless dental approximant

θ̞

Audio sample
- source · help

A voiceless dental approximant is a similar sound with less turbulent airflow. It is reported for some dialects of Chilean Spanish. The IPA has no dedicated symbol that represents this sound, but it may be transcribed as ⟨θ̞⟩ (a lowered [θ]), or ⟨θ̞᫈⟩ (a lowered and advanced [θ]) if interdental.

Language		Word	IPA	Meaning	Notes
Spanish	Chilean	socito	[θ̞oˈθ̞it̪o]	'partner/buddy' (dim)	Allophone of /s/; may be either dental [θ̞] or interdental [θ̞᫈]. In variation with numerous other allophones (depending on position) with varying degrees of stigmatization, with up to 15 allophones of /s/ in total: three approximants [θ̞, θ̞᫈, s̞], ten fricatives [θ, θ̟, s, s͎, s̠, z, ɕ, ʂ᫈, h, ɦ], one affricate [ts], and one null phone [∅].

== See also ==
- Voiced dental fricative
- Voiceless alveolar non-sibilant fricative
- Voiced dental sibilant
- Voiceless alveolar retracted sibilant
- Pronunciation of English th
- Index of phonetics topics

== Notes ==
Place →	Labial					Coronal										Dorsal					Laryngeal			
Manner ↓	Bilabial		Labiodental		Linguolabial		Dental		Alveolar		Postalveolar		Retroflex		(Alveolo-)palatal		Velar		Uvular		Pharyngeal/epiglottal		Glottal	
Nasal	m̥	m	ɱ̊	ɱ		n̼	n̪̊	n̪	n̥	n	n̠̊	n̠	ɳ̊	ɳ	ɲ̊	ɲ	ŋ̊	ŋ	ɴ̥	ɴ				
Plosive	p	b	p̪	b̪	t̼	d̼	t̪	d̪	t	d			ʈ	ɖ	c	ɟ	k	ɡ	q	ɢ	ʡ		ʔ	
Sibilant affricate							t̪s̪	d̪z̪	ts	dz	t̠ʃ	d̠ʒ	tʂ	dʐ	tɕ	dʑ								
Non-sibilant affricate	pɸ	bβ	p̪f	b̪v			t̪θ	d̪ð	tɹ̝̊	dɹ̝	t̠ɹ̠̊˔	d̠ɹ̠˔			cç	ɟʝ	kx	ɡɣ	qχ	ɢʁ	ʡʜ	ʡʢ	ʔh	
Sibilant fricative							s̪	z̪	s	z	ʃ	ʒ	ʂ	ʐ	ɕ	ʑ								
Non-sibilant fricative	ɸ	β	f	v	θ̼	ð̼	θ	ð	θ̠	ð̠	ɹ̠̊˔	ɹ̠˔	ɻ̊˔	ɻ˔	ç	ʝ	x	ɣ	χ	ʁ	ħ	ʕ	h	ɦ
Approximant		β̞		ʋ				ð̞		ɹ		ɹ̠		ɻ		j		ɰ						˷
Tap/flap		ⱱ̟		ⱱ					ɾ̥	ɾ			ɽ̊	ɽ						ɢ̆		ʡ̆		
Trill	ʙ̥	ʙ							r̥	r		r̠	ɽ̊r̥	ɽr					ʀ̥	ʀ	ʜ	ʢ		
Lateral affricate									tɬ	dɮ			tꞎ	d𝼅	c𝼆	ɟʎ̝	k𝼄	ɡʟ̝						
Lateral fricative							ɬ̪		ɬ	ɮ			ꞎ	𝼅	𝼆	ʎ̝	𝼄	ʟ̝						
Lateral approximant								l̪	l̥	l		l̠	ɭ̊	ɭ	ʎ̥	ʎ	ʟ̥	ʟ		ʟ̠				
Lateral tap/flap									ɺ̥	ɺ			𝼈̊	𝼈		ʎ̆		ʟ̆						

		BL	LD	D	A	PA	RF	P	V	U
Implosive	Voiced	ɓ			ɗ		ᶑ	ʄ	ɠ	ʛ
Implosive	Voiceless	ɓ̥			ɗ̥		ᶑ̊	ʄ̊	ɠ̊	ʛ̥
Ejective	Stop	pʼ			tʼ		ʈʼ	cʼ	kʼ	qʼ
Ejective	Affricate		p̪fʼ	tθʼ	tsʼ	tʃʼ	tʂʼ	tɕʼ	kxʼ	qχʼ
Ejective	Fricative	ɸʼ	fʼ	θʼ	sʼ	ʃʼ	ʂʼ	ɕʼ	xʼ	χʼ
Ejective	Lateral affricate				tɬʼ			c𝼆ʼ	k𝼄ʼ	q𝼄ʼ
Ejective	Lateral fricative				ɬʼ					
Click (top: velar; bottom: uvular)	Tenuis	kʘ qʘ		kǀ qǀ	kǃ qǃ		k𝼊 q𝼊	kǂ qǂ		
Click (top: velar; bottom: uvular)	Voiced	ɡʘ ɢʘ		ɡǀ ɢǀ	ɡǃ ɢǃ		ɡ𝼊 ɢ𝼊	ɡǂ ɢǂ		
Click (top: velar; bottom: uvular)	Nasal	ŋʘ ɴʘ		ŋǀ ɴǀ	ŋǃ ɴǃ		ŋ𝼊 ɴ𝼊	ŋǂ ɴǂ	ʞ	
Click (top: velar; bottom: uvular)	Tenuis lateral				kǁ qǁ					
Click (top: velar; bottom: uvular)	Voiced lateral				ɡǁ ɢǁ					
Click (top: velar; bottom: uvular)	Nasal lateral				ŋǁ ɴǁ					
