= Sidi Mohamed Ben Abdellah University =

University in Morocco

- Université Sidi Mohamed Ben Abdellah
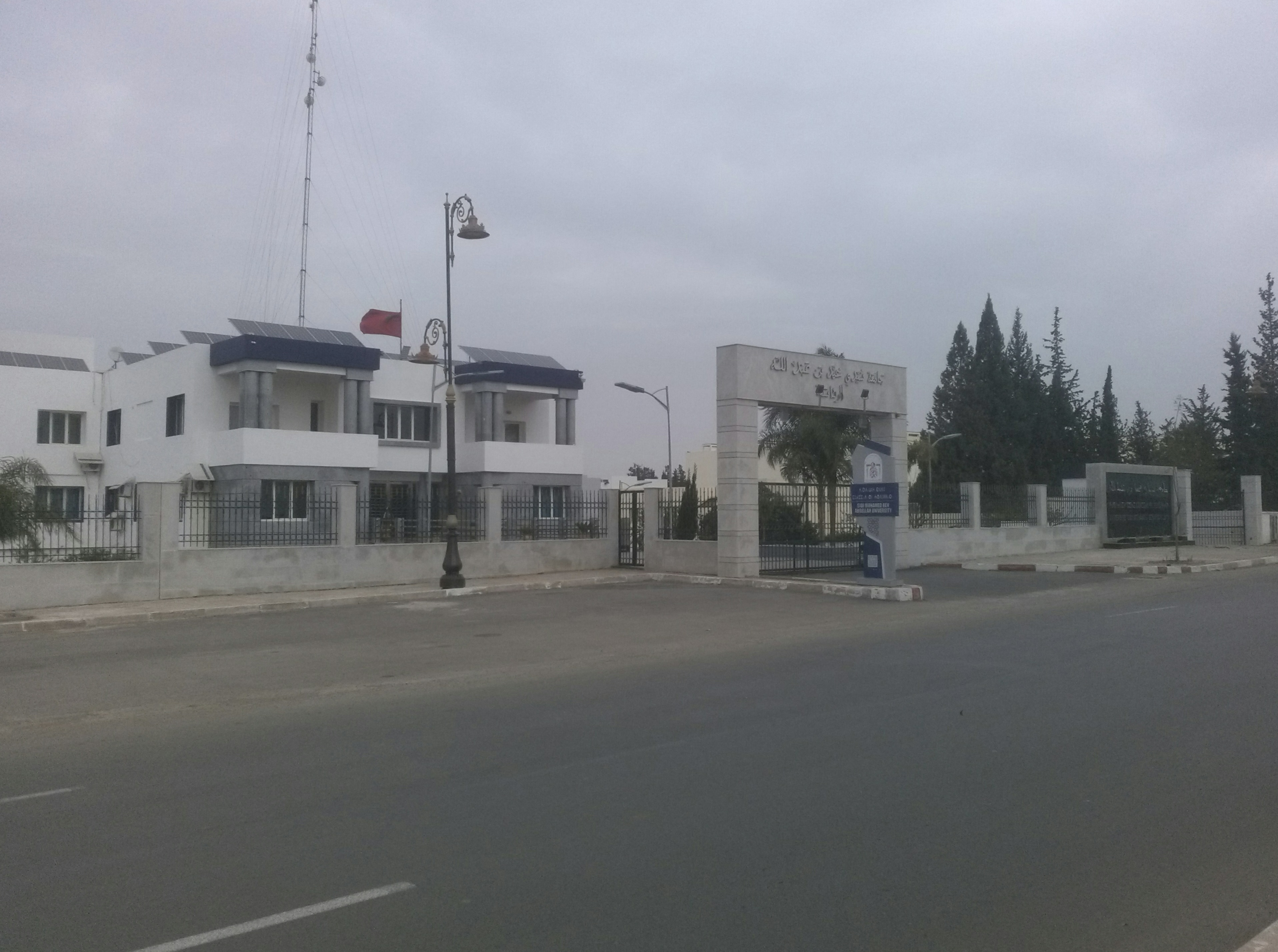
- Type: Public
- Established: 1975; 51 years ago
- President: Pr. Mustapha Ijjaali
- Faculty: c. 1,200
- Students: c. 86,000
- Location: Fez, Morocco; 34°02′00″N 4°58′50″W
- Campus: Dhar El Mahraz and Saïs
- Website: www.usmba.ac.ma

Sidi Mohamed Ben Abdellah University (French: Université Sidi Mohamed Ben Abdellah; Arabic: جامعة سيدي محمد بن عبد الله) is a university in Fez city, Morocco, which was founded in 1975. It is named for Mohammed ben Abdallah.

In 2022, the Times Higher Education World University Rankings rated Sidi Mohamed Ben Abdellah University as the best higher education institution in Morocco. It was the only Moroccan university to be ranked in the top 1,000 globally.

== Organization ==
The university is organized into several faculties and schools distributed across two main campuses in Fez (Dhar El Mahraz and Saïs), as well as locations in Taza and Taounate:

=== Dhar El Mahraz Campus ===
- Faculty of Sciences Dhar El Mahraz (FSDM)
- Faculty of Legal, Economic and Social Sciences of Fez (FSJES)
- Faculty of Letters and Human Sciences – Dhar El Mahraz (FLDM)

=== Saïs Campus ===
- Faculty of Sciences and Techniques of Fez]] (FST)
- Faculty of Medicine, Pharmacy and Dental Medicine (FMPF)
- National School of Applied Sciences of Fez (ENSA)
- National School of Business and Management of Fez (ENCG)
- Faculty of Letters and Human Sciences – Saïs (FLS)
- Higher School of Technology (EST)

=== Satellite Campuses ===
- Polydisciplinary Faculty of Taza (FP Taza)
- Faculty of Sharia of Fez
