= Moha Ennaji =

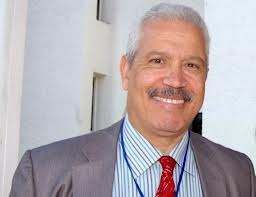
- Born: Azilal, Morocco

Academic background
- Education: Mohammed V University at Rabat (BA) 1976, University of Essex (MA) 1980, (PhD) 1982

Academic work
- Main interests: Generative linguistics, Analytic philosophy
- Website: http://www.inlac.net INLAC

Moha Ennaji (Arabic: موحى الناجي) is a Moroccan linguist, author, political critic, and civil society activist. He is a university professor in the Department of English Language and Literature at Sidi Mohamed Ben Abdellah University at Fes, where he has worked for over 30 years. In addition to his publications in linguistics, he has written on language, education, migration, social movements, and gender, and is the author or editor of over 20 books.

His work includes Social Movements and Democratization in North Africa 1912-2024 (Palgrave, London/ New York, 2026), Moroccan Muslim Migrant in Europe (Palgrave, London/ New York, 2014), Multiculturalism and Democracy in North Africa (Routledge, London/New York, 2014), Multilingualism, Cultural Identity and Education in Morocco (Springer, New York, 2005), "Language and Gender in the Mediterranean Region", International Journal of the Sociology of Language issue 190, editor (The Hague, 2008), Migration and Gender in Morocco, co-authored (Red Sea Press, 2008), Women Writing Africa, the Northern Region, co-edited (The Feminist Press, 2009). Women in the Middle East, co-edited (Routledge, 2010), Gender and Violence in the Middle East (Routledge, 2011).

Moha Ennaji has been a professor at Fès University and a visiting professor at Rutgers University. He is the president of the South North Center for Intercultural Dialogue and a founding president of the International Institute for Languages and Cultures at Fès, Morocco. His writing has also appeared in international publications including Common Ground News, Project Syndicate, Al-Safir, Al-Ahram, Khaleej Times, Japan Times, The Boston Globe and in many Arabic newspapers.

Since the 1980s, Ennaji has been working for the revival of Berber (Amazigh) language in Morocco and the protection of human rights, especially women’s rights in the Middle East and North Africa region. His work has been in fields such as Arabic and Berber linguistics and the sociology of language.

== Publications ==
Edited books:

- Les nouveaux défis de la migration Maghreb-Europe ( Peter Lang, Lausanne, 2024, French Edition)
- Managing Cultural Diversity in the Mediterranean Region (Cambridge Scholars Publishing, Newcastle , 2020)
- Multiculturalism and Democracy in North Africa (Routledge, London/New York, 2014)
- Multilingualism, Cultural Identity and Education in Morocco (2005). New York: Springer
- Language and Gender in the Mediterranean Region (ed.), IJSL Issue 190. 2008. Mouton de Gruyter
- Co-author, Migration and Gender in Morocco (2008). Co-authored. Renton, NJ: Red Sea Press
- Multiculturalisme et démocratie dans le monde musulman (ed.), (2010), Fès : Imagerie Pub.
- Co-edited Women in the Middle East and North Africa.(2010) London: Routledge
- Gender and Violence in the Middle East. Co-edited (2011) London: Routledge

Books

Written books:

- Social Movements and Democratization in North Africa 1912-2024 (Palgrave, London/ New York, 2026).
- Moroccan Muslim Migrant in Europe (Palgrave, London/ New York, 2014).
- L’été berbère (2026), Paris: L’Harmattan.
- Trahison et Châtiment (2024), Paris: L’Harmattan.
- Douce Lumière (2022), Rabat : Marsam.
- L'olivier de la sagesse (2017), Paris: Karthala.
- Muslim Moroccan Migrants in Europe (2014):.
- Gender and Migration (in co-authorship with F.Sadiqi) (2008). Trenton:.
- Multilingualism, Cultural Identity and Education in Morocco (2005). New York: Springer.
- A Grammar of Moroccan Arabic (2004a). Fès: University of Fès Publications (in co-authorship with A. Makhoukh, H. Es-saiydy, M. Moubtassime, S. Slaoui.
- A Grammar of Amazigh (Berber) (2004b). Fès: University of Fès Publications (in co-authorship with Fatima Sadiqi).
- Applications of Modern Linguistics (1994), in co-authorship with F. Sadiqi, Casablanca: Afrique Orient.
- Introduction to Modern Linguistics (1992), in co-authorship with F. Sadiqi, Casablanca: Afrique Orient.
- Contrastive Analysis (1985), Wurzburg: Konigshausen & Neumann.

=== Articles and Chapters in Gender Studies and Migration ===
- Mernissi's impact on Islamic feminism: a critique of the religious approach, British Journal of Middle Eastern Studies, 2022, v. 49, n. 4, p. 629.
- Women and Political Participation in Morocco and North African States. Chapter published in Gender and Power, Edited by Mino Vianello and Mary Hawkesworth, pages 35–52. New York:Palgrave, 2016.
- Recruitment of Foreign Male and Female Fighters to Jihad. In International Review of Sociology. Vol. 26, Number 3. November 2016, pp. 546–557.
- Women, Gender, and Politics in Morocco. In Social Sciences. Vol 5, Number 75. November 2016, pp. 2–8.
- Violence Against Underage Domestic Girls in Morocco, In Salhi, Z. (Ed.). Gender and Violence in Muslim Societies. London: I.B.Tauris. 2013. Pages: 132-160
- Arab Women’s Unfinished Revolution. The Project Syndicate. 2013.
- “Women’s Activism and the New Family Code Reforms in Morocco” The IUP Journal of History and Culture, Vol. VI, No. 1, January 2012, pp. 52–70
- Ennaji, M. (2012). Media and Moroccan Migrants. Journal of New Media Studies at MENA. Issue 1: 9-21.
- Ennaji, M. (2012). Undocumented Labor Migration from Morocco to Europe: An African Perspective. In Okome, M.O. and Vaughan, O. (Eds.). Transnational Africa and Globalization. New York: Palgrave Macmillan.
- The Modern Islamists of the Maghreb. The Project Syndicate. 2012.
- Ennaji, M. (2010). Moroccan Migrants in Europe and Islamophobia. In Comparative Studies of South Asia, Africa and the Middle East. Vol.30, No 1: 14-20.
- Ennaji, M. (2010). Migration marocaine et co-développement à l’heure de la crise financière. In Migration, Droits de l’Homme et Développement. Coordination : M. Lahlou & M. Zouiten. Rabat: Faculté de Droit, Souissi. Pages 197-209.
- Reform without Regime Change. Common Ground News. 2010
- Civil Society Transforms Morocco. Common Ground News. 2010.
- “Multilinguisme, Genre et Participation Politique au Maroc. », in Diogène No 225, pages 56–69. 2009.
- “Multilingualism, Citizenship and Berber Education” (2009). Mediterranean Journal of Education Studies.
- “Women’s NGOs and Social Change in Morocco”, in Women in the Middle East and North Africa, Edited by F.Sadiqi and M. Ennaji (2010). London: Routledge.
- “Steps to the Integration of Moroccan Women in Development” (2008). In British Journal of Middle Eastern Studies, 35:3, 339-348
- “Representations of women in Moroccan Proverbs” (2008). In Language and Gender in the Mediterranean Region (M. Ennaji, Editor). IJSL Issue. The Hague: Mouton de Gruyter.
- “ Women’s Activism, Social Change and the Feminization of Public Space in Morocco” in co-authorship with F. Sadiqi (in JMEWS, Vol 2, No 2: 86-114, 2006)
- “Social Policy in Morocco : A Historical and Analytical Approach” (2006). In V.Moghadam and Massoud, K. (Editors). Social Policy in the Middle East. London: Palgrave.
- “Women’s NGOs and Civil Society in Morocco”(2006). In Femmes Méditerranéennes et leurs Droits (F.Sadiqi, Editor). Fès : Publications of the University of Fès. Pages :81-92.
- « La Femme Marocaine et la Mondialisation, in L’Europe : Une Chance pour la Femme Musulmane ? », La Pensée et les hommes, (2004), pp. 57–74.
- “Women and Development in Morocco”. Mediterranean Women, F. Sadiqi (ed) (2004). Fès: Fès-Saiss Publications.
- “Civil Society, Gender and Social Cohesion”. In M. Ennaji (ed), Civil Society, Gender and Sustainable Development (2004b). Fès: Fès-Saiss Publications.
- “Human Rights and Cultural Relativism in North Africa”. Dahesh Voice, (2006).
- “ What Role Can English Departments Play in their Socio-economic Environment?”(1998). In Linguistics and English Literature in Maghreb Universities, pp. 235–240. Fès: Publication of the Faculty of Letters.
- "The Moroccan University: Is there an alternative?" in Interdisciplinarity and the University, publications of the Faculty of Letters, Rabat,1997
- "The Role of Education in the Socio-economic Context of the Maghreb", in Proceedings of the 9th Mate Conference, Agadir 1989c.

=== Articles and Chapters in Sociolinguistics ===
- “Urbanization and Changes in Arabic: The Case of Casablanca. In David Singleton, Joshua A. Fishman, Larissa Aronin & Muiris Ó Laoire (Eds.). Current Multilingualism: A New Linguistic Dispensation (2013).
- « Berber in Contact with Maghrebi Colloquial Arabic : A Case of Language Revitalization.” In Languages and Linguistics (2013), 32: 39-58.
- “Language and Nationalism in Morocco” (in co-authorship with F.Sadiqi). (2008).
- “Arabic Sociolinguistics and Cultural Diversity in Morocco” (2008).
- “Representations of women in Moroccan Proverbs” (2008). In Language and Gender in the Mediterranean Region (M. Ennaji, Editor). IJSL Issue. The Hague: Mouton de Gruyter.
- “Amazigh Language: Facts and Prospects”, (2006). In a Fetscherift to Dean Mohamed Chad. Fès: Publications of the University of Fès.
- “Multilinguisme et Genre au Maroc” (2004a). In Languages and Linguistics 14: 105-119.
- “Standardisation du Lexique Amazighe : Le Cas des Néologismes” (2004b). In Standardisation de l’Amazighe.
- “Attitudes to Berber and Tifinagh Script” (2003a).
- “Reflections on Arabisation and Education in Morocco (2003b).
- “Berber Language and the Consolidation of Democracy” (2003c) (in Arabic).
- “Education et Langues Maternelles: l’Exemple de l’Amazighe” (2003d), In Proceedings of the Conference by Fondation BMCE, 17 juin 2003, pp. 91–100.
- “L’Amazigh Composante Incontournable de la Culture Marocaine” (2003e). Edition du Samedi, 15 November 2003
- “Language Contact, Arabization Policy and Education in Morocco” (2002a).
- “ Comment on Hudson’s Outline of a Theory of Diglossia” (2002b).
- “ Arabisation (2002c). In Francophone Studies. Edited by Margaret A. Majumdar (2002), 14. London: Arnold.
- “ On the Main Differences between Standard and Moroccan Arabic Complex Sentences" (2002d). In Aspects of the Dialects of Arabic Today. Edited by Abderrahim Youssi et al. Rabat: Amapatril.
- “Writing Berber: Towards a Unified Orthography” (2002e).
- “North Africa” (2002f). In Encyclopedia of Twentieth-Century African History (2002f). Edited by Zeleza, P. (2002). London: Routledge.
- “De la Diglossie à la Quadriglossie". In Languages and Linguistics (2001) 8: 49-64.
- “On Preserving Arabic and Berber Oral Tradition in North Africa” (2000). In Languages and Linguistics 6, 79-87.
- “Language and Ethnic Identity, The Arab World (Maghreb and Near East) (1999a). In Handbook of Language and Ethnic Identity, ed. By Joshua, A. Fishman, 382-395, Oxford: Oxford University Press.
- “Language and Ideology: Evidence from Media Discourse in Morocco” (1999b). In Social Dynamics Vol. 25, No. 1: 150-161.
- “The Sociology of Berber: Change and Continuity” (1997). In Berber Sociolinguistics. Special Issue. International Journal of the Sociology of Language 123, 23-40.
- “Arabic Varieties in North Africa” (1998). In Notes and Records 7: 10. Cape Town: CASAS Publications.
- “A Syntactico-semantic study of the Language of News in Morocco” (1995). In Sociolinguistics in Morocco. Special Issue. International Journal of the Sociology of Language 112, 97-111.
- “On the Differences between American and British English”(1992). In
- “ Aspects of Multilingualism in the Maghreb” (1991). In Sociolinguistics of the Maghreb. Special Issue. International Journal of the Sociology of Language 87, 7-25.
- “ An Evaluative Report on the ELT Objectives at the University : A Focus on the Learner” (1990)., in The Proceedings of the XIth MATE Conference on English Language Teaching in the Maghreb: Current Issues in Evaluation, pp:29-42.
- “On Fishman’s Language Planning Policies” (1989). In Revue de la Faculté des Lettres 10:85-92.
- “Language Planning in Morocco and Changes in Arabic” (1988a). In International Journal of the Sociology of Language 74: 9-39.
- "The Impact of Nationalism and Nationism on the Languages in Contact in Morocco" (1988b), in Langues et Littératues VI: 37-48.

=== Articles in Morphosyntax ===
- “La Structure Morphologique du Causatif en Amazigh” (2005). In La Structure Morpologique de l’Amazigh. Edited by Ameur, M. et al. Rabat : Ircam publications.
- “The Structure of Clitics in Berber” (2003). In Languages and Linguistics 11: 71-82.
- “Clitics in Berber” (2002a) (in co-authorship with F.Sadiqi). In Languages and Linguistics 10: 97-116.
- “The Construct State in Berber” (2001), in Studies in the Linguistic Sciences, Vol 31, No 2: 55-72. University of Illinois at Urbana-Champaign Publication.
- “Negation, Tense and the Licensing of N-Words in Standard Arabic (in co-authorship with F.Sadiqi). In Languages and Linguistics (1999) 4:19-44.
- “Aspects of Cliticization in Arabic” (2000). In Linguistic Variation: From Facts to Theories, pp. 119–151. Edited by M. Ennaji.
- “The Construct State in Arabic and Berber” (1998). In The Proceedings of the First Chamito-semitic Conference, pp. 121–134.
- “Pronominal Elements and Binding” (1997). In Voisinage, pp. 247–266. Fès : Faculty of Letters Publication.
- “Pronouns vs. Clitics” (1995).. In Etudes Linguistiques, Revue de la Faculté des Lettres, Fès, pp. 37–52. Fès : Faculty of Letters Publication.
- “AGR and Clitics : The Morpho-Syntax Interface, ms. Faculty of Letters, Fès.
- "A Copulative Approach to Verbless Sentences in Moroccan Arabic" (1990), in La Linguistique au Maghreb, edited by J. Pleines, Rabat: Okad,.
- "WH-Questions and Focus in Tamazight" (1989), in Linguistica Communicatio 1:17-30.
- “Analyse des Questions-ma en Tamazight”, (1989), in Maknasat 3: 43-53.
- "Non-Verbal Predicates in Moroccan Arabic"(1988), in Proceedings of the First International Conference of the Linguistic Society of Morocco. Rabat: Editions Okad.
- "The Syntax of Free Relatives in English, Moroccan Arabic and Berber"(1986a), in Revue de la Faculté des Lettres. Fès: Publication of the Faculty of Letters, pp. 8:87-94
- "The Syntax of Cleft Sentences in Berber" (1986b), in co-authorship with F.Sadiqi, Studies of Language 10,1.

=== Articles in Language Teaching ===
- “On the Teaching of Amazigh Language”, (2006). In Le Substrat Amazigh de la Culture Marocaine (M. Ennaji, Editor). Fès: University of Fès Publications.
- “Teaching Human Rights in the Classroom” (2004).
- “The Role of Technology as a Teaching Material.” (2002).
- "Reinforcing Communicative Writing"(1994), in Proceedings of the National ELT Symposium, pp. 95–100. Fès: Publication of the Faculty of Letters ...
- "On Fishman's Language Planning Policies", in Revue de la Faculté des Lettres de Fès 10, 1989b.
- "The Role of Linguistics in the Socio-economic Context of the Maghreb",
- "Towards a Moroccan Model of English Language Teaching" (1988),
- "Strategies and Techniques for Scoring compositions" (1987).
- “The Relevance of Contrastive Analysis to Foreign Language Teaching” (1986).
