= 2025–2026 southern Yemen campaign =

- Part of the South Yemen insurgency and the Southern Transitional Council conflict
Date	2 December 2025 – 9 January 2026 (1 month and 1 week)
Location	Southern Yemen
Result	PLC–Saudi victory; Southern Transitional Council dissolves itself on 9 January 2026
Territorial changes	The STC initially held around 52% of Yemen's territory, including almost the entirety of former South Yemen; Following the counteroffensive, the STC loses all its gains along with its capital of Aden, and chairman Aidarus al-Zoubaidi flees Yemen; UAE troops withdraw from Yemen

Belligerents
Southern Transitional Council (STC); Supported by: United Arab Emirates	Yemeni Government (PLC); Hadhramaut Tribal Alliance (HTA); Saudi Arabia

Commanders and leaders
Aidarus al-Zoubaidi (AWOL); Abu Ali al-Hadrami (AWOL); Mukhtar al-Nubi; Hani bin Burayk; Jalal Ali Muhammad al-Jaari	(Yemen) Saleh al-Ja'imlani; Amr bin Habrish; Turki bin Bandar; Turki al-Maliki

Units involved
Southern Armed Forces; 14th Lightning Brigade; 5th Support and Reinforcement Brigade; Barshid Brigade; 2nd Military Region (pro-STC units); Hadhrami Elite Forces; Shabwah Defence Forces; Giants Brigades (until 6 January)	Yemeni Armed Forces; Homeland Shield Forces; Yemeni Land Forces; 1st Military Region; 2nd Military Region; Hadhramaut Protection Forces; Giants Brigades (after 7 January); Saudi Arabian Armed Forces; Royal Saudi Air Force; Royal Saudi Navy

Strength
10,000 fighters	15,000+ fighters

Casualties and losses
Per STC: 80 killed 152 wounded 130 captured 500 missing	Per Yemeni Armed Forces: 32 killed; 45 injured; Per HTA: 6 killed

On 2 December 2025, during the Yemeni civil war, the Southern Transitional Council (STC)—a secessionist faction backed by the United Arab Emirates—launched a large-scale military offensive across southern Yemen, breaking years of military stalemate in the conflict. The operation began in the Hadhramaut Governorate, which at the time was under the control of the internationally recognized, Saudi-backed government of Yemen.

The STC advanced rapidly, seizing several government-held areas in northern Wadi Hadhramaut, including the cities of Seiyun and Tarim. The offensive then expanded into the neighboring Al-Mahrah Governorate and other adjacent regions. Codenamed "Operation Promising Future", the campaign saw rapid territorial gains, and by 9 December the STC had taken control of most areas spanning the six governorates of the former South Yemen.

On 30 December, the Royal Saudi Air Force carried out airstrikes on the STC-controlled port city of Mukalla, targeting what it said was a shipment of weapons that had arrived from the UAE. The UAE denied that the shipments contained weapons. Shortly afterward, the internationally recognized Yemeni government ordered all UAE forces to leave Yemeni territory within 24 hours, announced a 72-hour air, land, and sea blockade, and declared a 90-day state of emergency. Later that day, the UAE announced it would voluntarily withdraw its remaining forces from Yemen following the Saudi strikes.

On 2 January 2026, the Yemeni government forces, supported by Saudi airstrikes, launched a counteroffensive to retake the territories captured by the STC. The STC later announced plans to hold an independence referendum within two years. Backed by Saudi Arabia, government forces advanced rapidly, recapturing Seiyun on 3 January and Mukalla the following day, reversing the STC gains. On 7 January, government forces began entering the STC's capital, Aden, amid the collapse of STC resistance. Subsequently, STC leader Aidarus al-Zoubaidi was removed from his position on the Yemeni Presidential Council, charged with treason, and fled to the UAE. On 9 January, the STC announced its dissolution following widespread territorial losses across the country.

== Background ==
Political and military control in Yemen at the start of the offensive. Note that STC and the Yemeni government had been largely cooperative; the base of the Yemeni government was in Aden until the offensives.

Yemen has been embroiled in a multi-sided civil war since 2014. In fighting the Houthis—who control most of northern Yemen, including the capital, Sanaa—the internationally recognized government, along with the Saudi-led coalition, partnered with the secessionist Southern Movement, which had since 2017 been dominated by the Southern Transitional Council (STC). Although officially a component of the government, the STC, which received extensive support and funding from the United Arab Emirates, independently controlled and administered most of southern Yemen and continued to voice its intentions to secede and establish a proposed federal "State of South Arabia."

Hadhramaut is Yemen's largest governorate, covering around a third of the country while holding nearly 80% of its oil reserves and other valuable minerals. Control over the territory had previously been split between the STC on the southern coast and the Yemeni Government further north, in an area known as Wadi Hadhramaut (Hadhramaut Valley). The STC had claimed that Wadi Hadhramaut had become rife with smuggling operations benefitting the Houthis, along with local Islamist groups, such as al-Qaeda in the Arabian Peninsula (AQAP).

== Prelude ==
Tensions had been rising in Hadhramaut since November 2025, between the STC and the Hadhramaut Tribal Alliance, a Saudi-backed group led by Amr bin Habrish. On 29 November, the Hadhramaut Protection Forces, the military wing of the tribal alliance, deployed around the Masila oil fields in Hadhramaut belonging to PetroMasila, the largest oil company in Yemen, in order to "defend national resources from any potential aggression or the external interference" according to Habrish. Oil production was blocked, which triggered energy shortages across the region, particularly hurting STC-held regions, which the STC saw as a threat. In response, the STC began a buildup of its military forces in Hadhramaut.

== Timeline ==
=== STC offensive ===
Political and military control in Yemen following the STC offensive

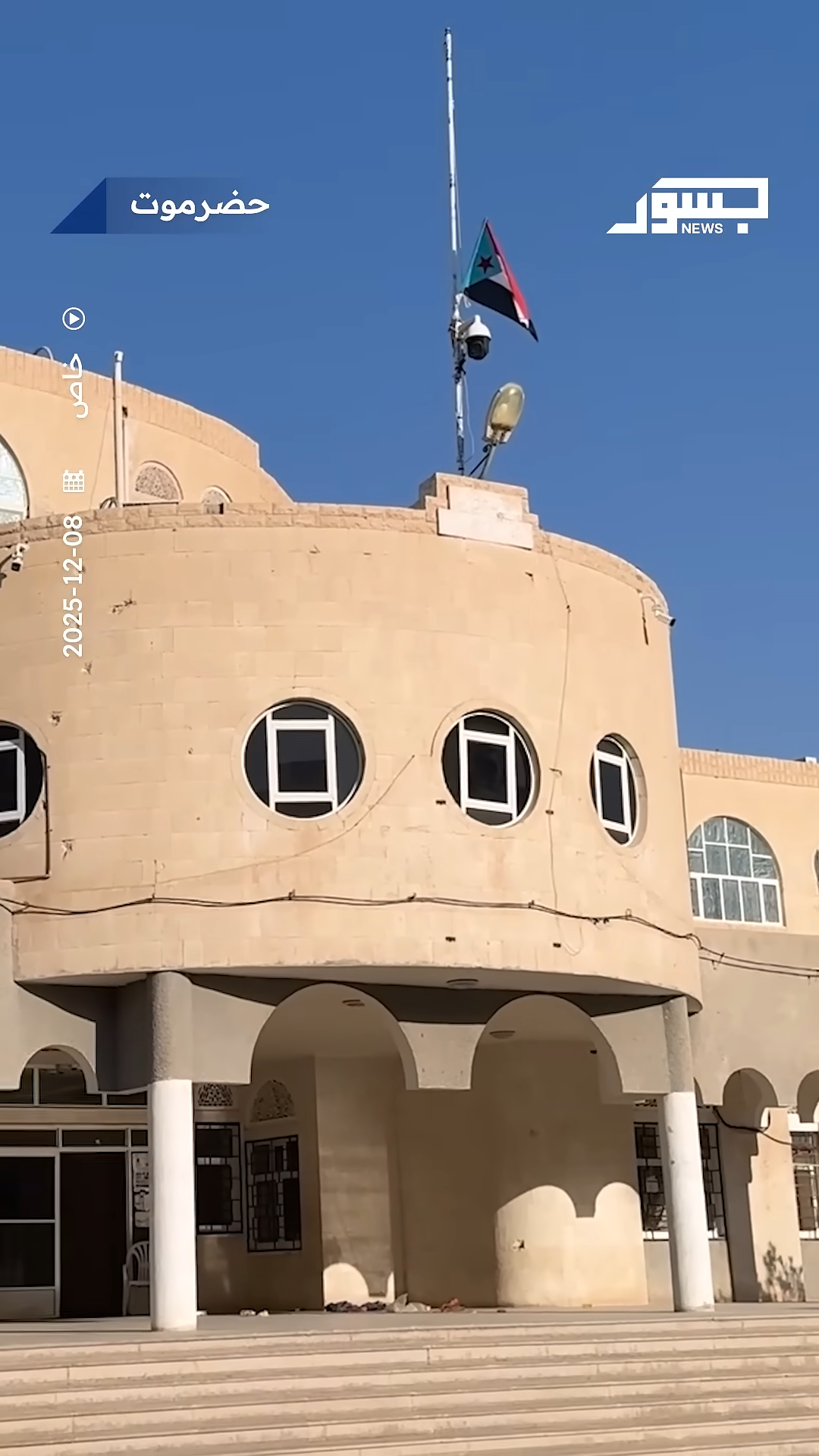
The flag of South Yemen raised atop a government building in Seiyun after the offensive

On 2 December, a large number of Southern Movement troops started advancing north through the Sah District, and by the end of the day they were a few tens of kilometres from Seiyun. The offensive in Wadi Hadhramaut was initiated by the STC's Southern Armed Forces on the morning of 3 December, led by the Hadhrami Elite Forces. In Seiyun, Southern Transitional Council forces were positioned in the Jathma area, before launching a bombardment against the headquarters of the 1st Military Region and other key targets in the city. The STC followed up the bombardment with a lightning offensive, leaving Yemeni Government forces in disarray. Brief clashes were reported between the STC and the 1st Military Region of the Yemeni Army, including at the presidential palace and the Seiyun International Airport.

Within hours of fighting, Southern Transitional Council personnel captured several positions and government facilities from the 1st Military Region, leading to the latter withdrawing its forces. From there, STC forces were able to capture the remainder of Seiyun by nightfall, before proceeding to rapidly advance throughout Wadi Hadhramaut, taking several other towns and military bases. By the end of the day, STC forces had captured nearly every strategically significant area in Wadi Hadhramaut, including Seiyun and its airport, the 1st Military Region headquarters, Tarim, Al-Qatn, Hawra', Al-Raddood, and Al-Khasha'a.

On 3 December, in the Arma District of Shabwa Governorate, STC forces claimed they had taken control of "a camp belonging to the Muslim Brotherhood" in the Arin desert. On 8 December, Southern forces took control of the Al-Uqlah oil field in the province. Southern Transitional Council forces were reportedly seen equipped with Emirati armoured vehicles and Chinese 155 mm AH4 howitzers, which the UAE has supplied to other proxies. Four deaths were reported among STC fighters from the 14th Lightning Brigade, 5th Support and Reinforcement Brigade, and Barshid Brigade. Casualties were also reportedly inflicted on Yemeni forces.

During the early hours of 4 December, STC forces seized the PetroMasila facility and the surrounding military positions from the Hadhramaut Tribal Alliance. The alliance withdrew from the area as part of a Saudi-backed agreement, ultimately relocating to As Sawm District, though the STC reported the deaths of four of their soldiers in small-scale clashes in the area. In Hadhramaut, Southern forces announced the capture of the 23rd Mechanized Brigade in the Al Abr area of Wadi Hadhramaut and the 11th Border Guard Brigade at the Rama camp. At the end of the day, the control of Al Abr camp was handed over to the Saudi-backed National Shield Forces.

On 4 December, Southern forces seized Al Ghaydah, the capital of Al-Mahrah Governorate, without a fight, as well as the port of Nishtun. On 5 December, the National Shield Forces handed over control of the Al Ghaydah Airport and the port of Nishtun. On 5 December, the National Shield Forces attempted to recapture Seiyun, but were repelled by the Southern forces. Saudi pressure caused the STC to temporarily surrender some of their captured sites; however, STC forces quickly counterattacked and recaptured all those areas almost immediately. The National Shield Forces took control of the 37th Armored Brigade's camp in Al-Khasha'a.

On 6 December, the 1st Support and Reinforcement Brigade of Hadrami Elite Forces captured the 315th Armored Brigade's camp in Thamud district of northern Hadramaut. Meanwhile, the 11th Border Guard Brigade's Ramah checkpoint was captured by the Al-Manahil tribesmen after an attack. Four members of the Giants Brigades were killed when an IED targeted their convoy in Hadhramaut Governorate. Very little actual resistance to STC advances was reported after the Southern Transitional Council took Seiyun, with Saudi-backed Yemeni Government forces withdrawing in the face of STC advances, and STC forces reportedly secured control of Hadhramaut Governorate roughly 48 hours later.

On 7 December, Southern forces entered Al Ghaydah after the sudden withdrawal of the Shield Forces from some positions inside the city. They also took control of the Sayhut, Qishn, and Al Masilah districts in the governorate. By the end of the day they also entered without a fight key coastal and border positions including the Shahn crossing with Oman and the port of Nishtun. On 10 December, Southern forces took control of the west gate of the Ghaydah International Airport while Shield Forces retained control of the airport itself. On 16 December 2025, Southern forces took control of the Nishtun port. On 23 December the National Shield Forces departed the Ghaydah International Airport following pressure from the Southern Transitional Council.

By 8 December, STC forces had seized control of most of the regions that were once part of South Yemen, including the entire southern coastline of Yemen, the border region with Oman, as well as Dhale Governorate and the oil fields in Hadhramaut Governorate, leaving Yemeni Government forces controlling only the northern reaches of those governorates; the Southern Transitional Council claimed control over all eight governorates on 9 December. By 9 December, STC forces were estimated to control 90–95% of the populated areas in the former South Yemen, in addition to holding at least 80% of Yemen's proven oil reserves. The STC forces in Hadhramaut had advanced as far as the outskirts of Al Abr, south of the Wadiah Border Crossing with Saudi Arabia. Of all the regions seized by the Southern Transitional Council, the Hadhramaut Governorate was the most strategically valuable one by far, with its control seen as critical for both the Yemeni Government and the STC's secession project.

=== Abyan offensive ===
On 16 December, the STC launched an offensive in Abyan Governorate, dubbed Operation Decisive, with the stated purpose of fighting Al-Qaeda in the Arabian Peninsula. The operation was described by both the STC and independent analysts as a continuation of the previous offensive.

=== Saudi–UAE rift ===
In the wake of the STC's large-scale territorial gains, Saudi Arabia amassed troops on their border with Yemen, and on 25 December, they demanded that STC forces withdraw from their recently seized areas in the Hadhramaut and Al-Mahrah Governorates, reportedly threatening airstrikes if they did not. However, STC forces refused to do so. On 26 December, Saudi Arabia conducted two airstrikes on STC positions in Wadi Nahb in Hadhramaut. The airstrikes followed clashes between the STC and a Saudi-linked tribal leader the previous day.

On 27 December, the Saudi-led coalition in Yemen said it would respond militarily to any separatist movements undermining de-escalation efforts in the region, once again calling on the STC to withdraw from the territories it occupied. According to a Yemeni military official, 15,000 Saudi-backed fighters were amassed on the Saudi–Yemeni border, although they had not been ordered into the two eastern governorates of Yemen.

On 30 December, a Saudi-led military coalition supporting Yemen's current government carried out an airstrike on two vessels from Fujairah in the United Arab Emirates which were docked at the port of Mukalla. According to the coalition, the two Emirati ships had no permits and delivered a large shipment of weapons and armored vehicles to the Southern Transitional Council (STC). An STC-aligned journalist reported that the strikes "shattered and damaged the windows of the building near the port."

On 31 December, the STC began evacuating deployment sites and partially withdrawing from several locations across Hadhramaut. On 1 January 2026, the STC refused to fully withdraw from the provinces it occupied, though it agreed to the deployment of the Saudi-backed National Shield Forces in those areas.

=== Yemeni government counter-offensive ===
On 2 January, the PLC chairman Rashad al-Alimi ordered Salem Ahmed Said Al-Khanbashi, the governor of Hadhramaut, to assume command of the Homeland Shield Forces in the governorate and begin a military operation to take control of all military bases and camps under STC control. On the same day, the Royal Saudi Air Force conducted air strikes in Al-Khasha and Seiyun, killing at least 20 STC fighters.

On 3 January, the military forces aligned with Saudi Arabia issued a statement confirming they had secured all military and civilian facilities throughout Al Mukalla, the main city of Hadramaut. Two government military officials told AFP that Saudi-backed troops had taken control of Al Mukalla's primary military installation.

On 4 January, Yemeni forces announced that the Homeland Shield Forces had recaptured all nine districts of Hadhramaut Governorate. The Yemeni government also announced that it had retaken control of Mukalla. Since the beginning of the Yemeni counter-offensive, at least 80 STC fighters were killed, 152 were wounded, while another 130 were captured. Footage showed that government forces retook the city of Mukalla, removing the Flag of South Yemen that was used by the STC.

=== Fall of Aden ===
On 7 January, Yemeni government forces began entering the STC capital, Aden, amid the collapse of STC forces. Subsequently, the head of STC, Aidarus al-Zoubaidi, was charged with treason by the Yemeni Presidential Council, and allegedly later fled to the UAE. The Saudi-led coalition alleged that Zoubaidi fled to the United Arab Emirates through Somaliland after departing for the port of Berbera from Aden. By late 7 January, Yemeni government forces were reported to be in full control of all districts of Aden Governorate, including Aden International Airport and the presidential palace.

On January 8, the STC announced that it had lost contact with 50 senior delegates who had travelled to Riyadh for talks. On 9 January, Secretary-General Abdulrahman Jalal al-Subaihi announced from Riyadh that the STC would be dissolved. However, STC spokesman Anwar al-Tamimi refuted the decision, stating that only the full council and the president could make such a decision that would be made "immediately upon the release of the Southern Transitional Council delegation currently in Riyadh". Saudi Arabia announced hosting a conference in Riyadh at an unspecified date to discuss the future of southern Yemen, to which al-Subaihi stated the STC would prepare for. On 10 January, the PLC announced that that it had retaken full control of areas previously held by the STC.

== Reactions ==
=== Domestic ===
- Yemen: PLC chairman Rashad al-Alimi accused the STC of instigating a "rebellion" that threatens to fracture the state and destabilize shipping lanes. Following the Saudi airstrikes on STC targets and two Emirati vessels on 30 December 2025, the Yemeni government said it was ending its joint defense agreement with the UAE, ordering all Emirati troops to withdraw from Yemen within 24 hours. Yemen also declared a 90-day state of emergency and a three-day closure of all entry points by land, sea, and air.
- Southern Transitional Council: The STC stated that their recent military actions were responding to "the calls of our southern people", and that they wanted to secure the area from terrorist threats and cut off supply and smuggling routes for the Houthis.
  - On 7 December, hundreds of demonstrators took to the streets of Khor Maksar, Aden Governorate, calling for the secession of South Yemen.

=== International ===
- Azerbaijan: Azerbaijan said it welcomed efforts by Saudi Arabia and the United Arab Emirates to de-escalate tensions in Yemen.
- Iran: Foreign Minister Esmail Baghaei called the developments "in line with the policies of the Zionist regime aimed at fragmenting regional countries", saying that they represent a source of concern for West Asian countries. Senior foreign policy advisor to Ali Khamenei, Ali Akbar Velayati, rebuked the United Arab Emirates, accusing it of engaging in imperialist aggression in Yemen and Sudan.
- Saudi Arabia: Saudi Arabia opposed the offensive, stating that it was "carried out unilaterally and without the approval of the Presidential Leadership Council nor in co-ordination with the coalition's leadership," warning that such "unjustified escalation" harms the "interests of the Yemeni people" as well as "the southern cause and the coalition's efforts." It called on the STC to cease its escalation and withdraw its forces from the Hadhramaut and Mahra governorates. It subsequently started conducting limited airstrikes on STC positions in Hadhramaut and accused the UAE of being behind the STC's advances, calling it an "extremely dangerous" move.
  - Brigadier General Turki al-Maliki said that "any military movements that violate these [de-escalation] efforts will be dealt with directly and immediately in order to protect civilian lives and ensure the success of restoring calm," and accused the STC of "serious and horrific human rights violations against civilians."
- United Arab Emirates: The UAE foreign ministry said that it reaffirms "its steadfast commitment to supporting all endeavors aimed at strengthening stability and development in Yemen." The UAE subsequently announced its full withdrawal from Yemen, expressing "deep regret" to Saudi accusations that it had been pressuring the STC to attack the Saudi-backed Yemeni government.
- United States: U.S. Secretary of State Marco Rubio expressed concern at the "recent events in southeastern Yemen" and urged restraint and continued diplomacy, while welcoming the Saudi Arabian and Emirati leadership's efforts to support Yemen's sovereignty and regional security.

=== Intergovernmental organizations ===
- European Union: The EU urged all Yemeni factions to prioritize national interests over division and engage in peace talks to end the conflict.
- United Nations: UN Secretary-General António Guterres warned against this dangerous new escalation, saying that such unilateral actions risk deepening divisions.

== See also ==
- 2022 Southern Yemen offensive
- Southern Transitional Council takeover of Socotra
