= Bin Afrar Palace =

Coordinates: 15°25′13″N 51°40′32″E

The Bin Afrar Palace, also known as Fort Afrar, is a palace in Qishn, al-Mahrah Governorate. It was the seat for the sultans of the Mahra Sultanate.

== Overview ==
The palace is known as Beit Hanub in the Mehri language, which means "the big house". The palace was built in 1287, and in 2014 AD it was restored by Abdullah bin Isa Al Afrar.
