= Oman–Yemen border =

International border

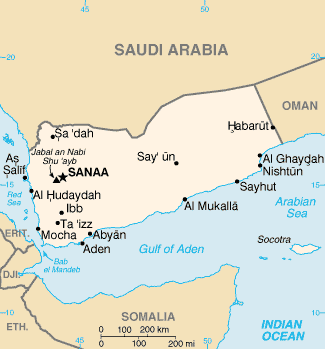
Map of Yemen, with Oman to the east

The Oman–Yemen border is 294 km (183 mi) in length and runs from the tripoint with Saudi Arabia in the north to the Arabian Sea in the south.

== Description ==
The border consists essentially of a single straight line orientated NW-SE, from the Saudi tripoint down to the Arabian Sea coast at Ras Darbat Ali. The exception is a small triangular 'kink' roughly halfway along the boundary line, which juts into Yemen so as to include the town of Habarut within Oman. Topographically the border traverses the Rub' al Khali desert in the north and the Jabal Qamar in the Dhofar Mountains in the south.

== History ==
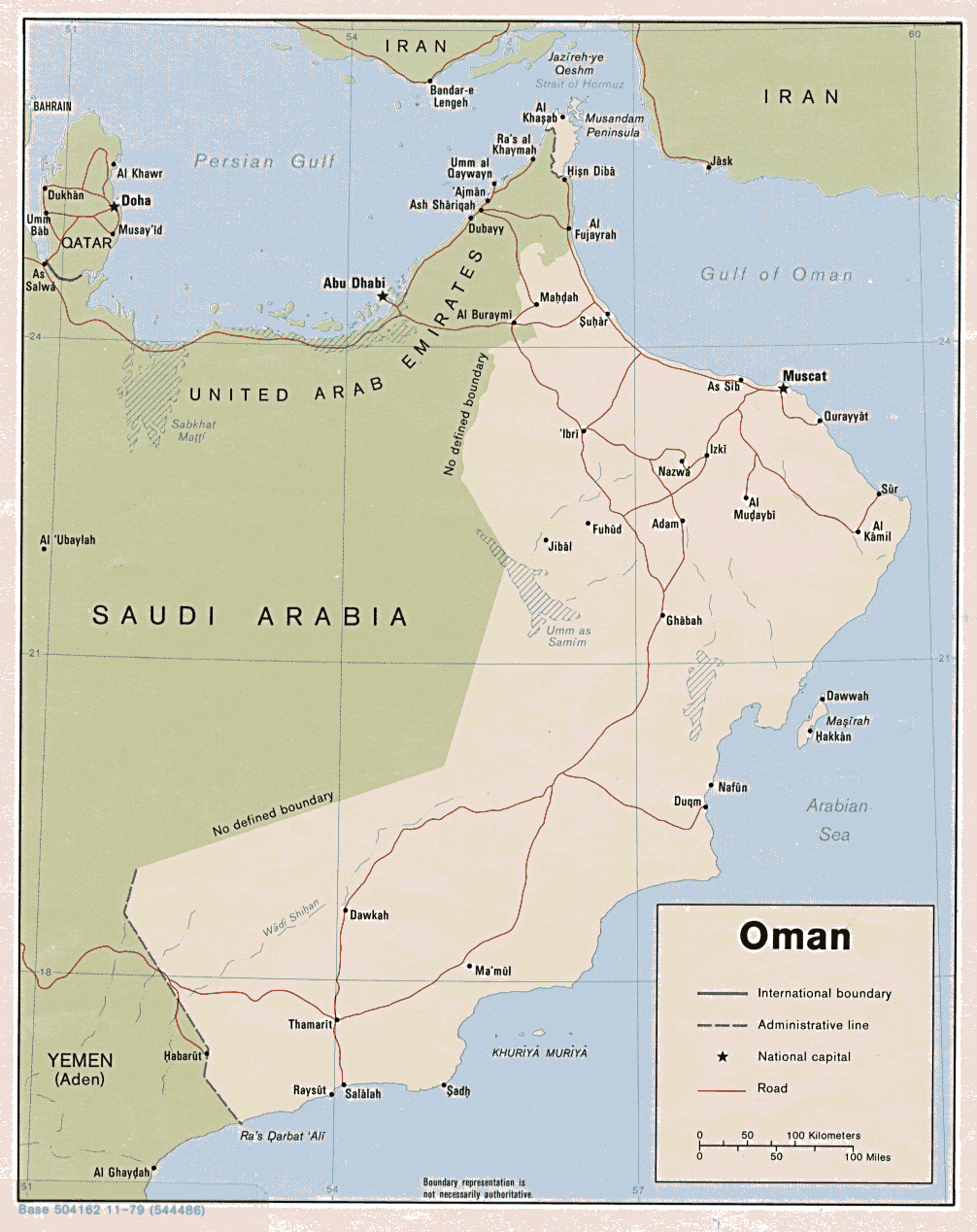
Map of Oman from 1979, showing the Yemen border as an administrative line

The far east of what is today Yemen historically formed the Sultanate of Mahra, which became part of Britain's Aden Protectorate in 1866, though retaining a degree of autonomy. In this period Oman was under an informal British protectorate. Oman had asserted its rule over the south-western Dhofar region in 1829. A border between the Aden and Oman was not demarcated during the colonial period, though British government documents suggest that the Ras Darbat Ali cape had been fixed as Oman's westernmost point as early as 1933–35, with a British government document recording that "it had been agreed that the question was not at that time an important one." A British letter of 1947 states that "the Frontier is shown as being on the west side of Ras Dharbar Ai in a Survey of India map of south-east Arabia 1:2,000,000, but on what authority this was done is not known. The mountain is locally recognised as being the boundary between Dhofar country and Mahra country on the coast at least, though to what extent this applied inland is not clear."

In 1962-3 Aden colony was split into the Federation of South Arabia in the west and the Protectorate of South Arabia in the east, both remaining under British protection. Following an insurgency in the region, Britain withdrew from Aden completely and the two protectorates were merged, gaining independence as South Yemen in 1967. Communists took over in 1969, renaming the country the 'People's Democratic Republic of Yemen', and abolishing the traditional semi-autonomy of the sultan of Mahra. North Yemen at this time remained a separate country. South Yemen's border with Oman remained undemarcated, and relations between the two states worsened during the Dhofar Rebellion, as South Yemen allowed the Communist Dhofari insurgents to base themselves in their territory, resulting in several cross-border skirmishes. Relations improved in the 1980s, with the two countries re-establishing diplomatic relations in 1983.

Following the collapse of the Communist government in South Yemen, and the subsequent unification with North Yemen in 1990, a border agreement between Oman and Yemen was signed on 1 October 1992 which finalised the frontier at its current position. The border region remained largely peaceful during the various civil wars in Yemen since then. During the present Yemeni Civil War that started in 2015, the border has remained under Yemen government control, though there have been reports of arms smuggling across the frontier, and Omani and Saudi interference in Yemen's Al Mahra Governorate.

== Border Crossings ==
There are two main crossings: at Shahan (YEM)-Al-Mazyunah (OMN) in the north, and Hawf (YEM)-Sarfait (OMN) in the south.

== See also ==
- Oman-Yemen relations
