= Sandfish skink =

There are two species of lizard named sandfish skink:

- Scincus scincus
- Scincus conirostris
