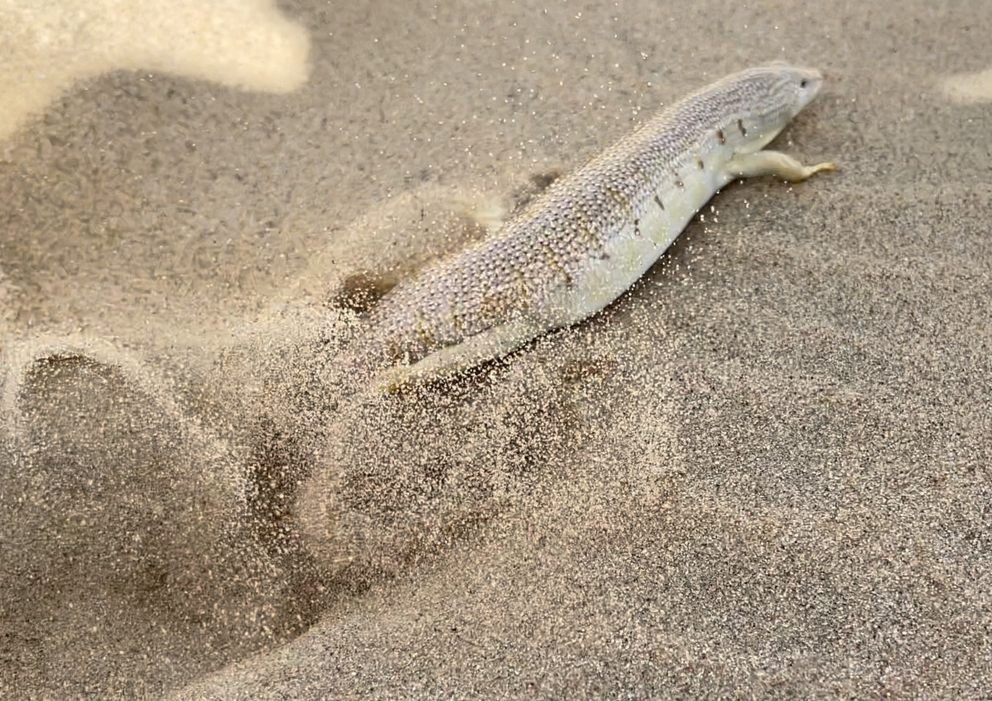
- Emerging from the sand, Al Wakrah, Qatar

Conservation status
- Least Concern (IUCN 3.1)

Scientific classification
- Kingdom: Animalia
- Phylum: Chordata
- Class: Reptilia
- Order: Squamata
- Family: Scincidae
- Genus: Scincus
- Species: S. mitranus

Binomial name
- Scincus mitranus Anderson, 1871

= Eastern skink =

Species of lizard

The eastern skink (Scincus mitranus), also known commonly as the Arabian sand skink and the eastern sandfish, is a species of lizard in the subfamily Scincinae of the family Scincidae (skinks). The species is native to the deserts and arid lands of the Arabian Peninsula north to Western Iran. Truly at home within fine, loosely-grained desert sand, this skink is known for resting while completely buried, keeping only its nostrils, and possibly part of its face, above ground for oxygen. In addition to ambushing passing invertebrate prey (likewise with only its nose or face exposed), S. mitranus will readily "dive" into the sand at the first sign of danger, appearing to "swim" through the dunes as it hastily buries itself deeper to hide. Its naturally glossy, shiny and smooth scales – typical of the skink family, in general – enable quick digging and rapid movement within the fine, often very hot, substrate, with no external injury or irritation to its body. This behavior has earned S. mitranus its common names of "sandfish" and "sand skink".

== Etymology ==
The specific name mitranus is after Indian archaeologist-anthropologist Babu Rajendralal Mitra (1824–1891).

== Description ==
Scincus mitranus may grow to a total length (tail included) of 20 cm (7.9 in) and have an orange-brown or sand-coloured back, and a white underside. On the side it has a line or spots in a light colour, and the back and legs have vague dark bands. The snout is shaped like a bill, and the legs and tail are short.

== Behaviour ==
The eastern skink can run quickly, or slide over the sand and dig itself in quickly when it is in danger.

== Diet ==
Scincus mitranus preys on several kinds of arthropods, especially centipedes and beetles.

== Distribution and habitat ==
Scincus mitranus is found in the southern, eastern and northern areas of the Arabian Peninsula (Kuwait, Oman, Qatar, Saudi Arabia, Bahrain and the United Arab Emirates), Western Iran (near Ahvaz) and potentially east into Pakistan, though its actual presence in the latter is disputed. In Oman, it has been sighted as far south and west as the region of Al-Mazyunah, Dhofar, close to the border with Yemen. In Saudi Arabia, it has been documented as far west as Riyadh and the deserts to the east of Al-Artawiyah and Umm Al Jamajm, north of the capital city. Scincus mitranus is associated with loose sand dune (aeolian) habitats.

== Reproduction ==
The eastern skink is ovoviviparous, which gives it an advantage compared to other species in the area, as its eggs cannot desiccate.
