= Mahra Sultanate =

1432–1967 sultanate in modern-day Yemen

Coordinates: 15°48′N 51°44′E

State of Mahra and Socotra الدولة المهرية للبر وسقطرى (Arabic) al-Dawla al-Mahriyya lil-Barr wa-Suquṭrā
- 1432–1967
- Flag Emblem

- Map of Mahra in 1923

- Location of Mahra within the Arabian peninsula in 1923
- Capital: Shihr (until 1495); Qishn; Tamrida/Hadibu
- Common languages: Arabic, Mehri
- Religion: Islam
- Demonym: Mehri
- Government: Monarchy
- History
  - Established: 1432
  - British protectorate: 1886
  - Dissolved: 30 November 1967
Preceded by	Succeeded by
Rasulid dynasty	South Yemen
- Today part of: Yemen; Oman

The Mahra Sultanate, known in its later years as the Mahra State of Qishn and Socotra, (Note: Arabic: الدولة المهرية للبر وسقطرى, romanized: al-Dawla al-Mahriyya lil-Barr wa-Suquṭrā) or sometimes the Mahra Sultanate of Ghayda and Socotra, (Note: Arabic: سلطنة المهرة في الغيضة وسقطرى, romanized: Salṭanat al-Mahra fī al-Ghayḍa wa-Suquṭrā) and formerly as the Afrari Arab Sultanate, (Note: Arabic: السلطنة العفرارية العربية) was a sultanate that included the historical region of Mahra and the Guardafui Channel island of Socotra in what is now eastern Yemen. It was ruled by the Banu Afrar dynasty for most of its history.

The Sultanate was inhabited by the Mehri people who spoke the Mahri language, a modern South Arabian language. The Mehri share, with their regional neighbours on the island of Socotra and in Dhofar, cultural traditions like a modern South Arabian language, and frankincense agriculture. The region benefits from a coastal climate, distinct from the surrounding desert climate, with seasons dominated by the khareef or monsoon.

In 1886, the Sultanate came under the British-ruled Aden Protectorate and later under the Protectorate of South Arabia. The Sultanate was abolished in 1967 upon the founding of the People's Republic of South Yemen. With the departure of the British from the larger southern Arabian region, the Aden-based South Yemeni government divided the sultanate, creating the Al Mahra Governorate and Socotra was administered by the Aden Governorate. The sultanate is now part of the Republic of Yemen and the Sultanate of Oman.

== History ==
=== As a sultanate ===
After the erosion of Abbasid authority in Yemen, the tribes of al-Mahra had grown distant from Arabic rule. The Ayyubids of Egypt held loose authority over the region, followed by the Rasulids of western Yemen.

==== Sultanate of Shihr ====
In 1432, the Ba Dujana family took control of the important coastal city of Shihr from the Rasulids, and then successfully repelled a Rasulid counterattack. In 1445, the Ba Dujana defended against an attack by the newly formed Kathiri state, securing their borders. The independent sultanate at Shihr was the first premodern state in Mahri lands.

Following the collapse of the Rasulid dynasty and the rise of the Tahirids, a number of former dignitaries from Aden came to Shihr as refugees, and told the reigning sultan, Muhammad bin Sa'd, that Aden was ripe for conquest. In 1456, Muhammad bin Sa'd launched a naval invasion of Aden with nine ships; however, much of the fleet was broken up in a storm and bin Sa'd was captured by the Tahirids. In retaliation, the Tahirid sultan sent an army commanded by Zayn al-Sunbuli to occupy Shihr. The campaign was only half-successful, and parts of the area were still held by the Ba Dujana. Determined to break the stalemate, Sultan Malik Amir bin Tahir led a great expedition across the desert coast from Aden to Mahra. Vastly outnumbered, the Ba Dujana retreated from Shihr ahead of the Tahirid advance. The Tahirids plundered the city and installed a governor who was loyal to their interests.

The city of Shihr was once more brought under the control of the Ba Dujana clan in 1478, when it was taken by their young leader, Sa'd bin Faris. Around 1480, the Mahri settled the island of Socotra and used it as a strategic base against their rivals in Hadhramaut. During this time, al-Mahra had been in a near-constant state of war with the Kathiri, who were trying to take control of Shihr. In 1488, the Ba Dujana enlisted the help of their Socotran allies to push the Kathiri out of Shihr once more.

==== Sultanate of Qishn and Socotra ====
Yet the dominance of the Ba Dujana clan would last only for another seven years. In 1495, bouts of infighting between the tribes of Mahra escalated into civil war. The Kathiri sultan, Jafar bin 'Amr, took advantage of the situation to support the Zwedi faction, ensuring the downfall of the Ba Dujana hegemony. After a disastrous defeat at Tabala, on the outskirts of Shihr, the Ba Dujana permanently lost control of the city and were isolated in the interior. They were replaced by the Zwedi and Afrari families of Qishn and Socotra, who, in sacrificing Shihr to the Kathiri state, managed to solidify the core Mahra domain as it would remain, more or less, until the present day.

==== Arrival of the Portuguese ====
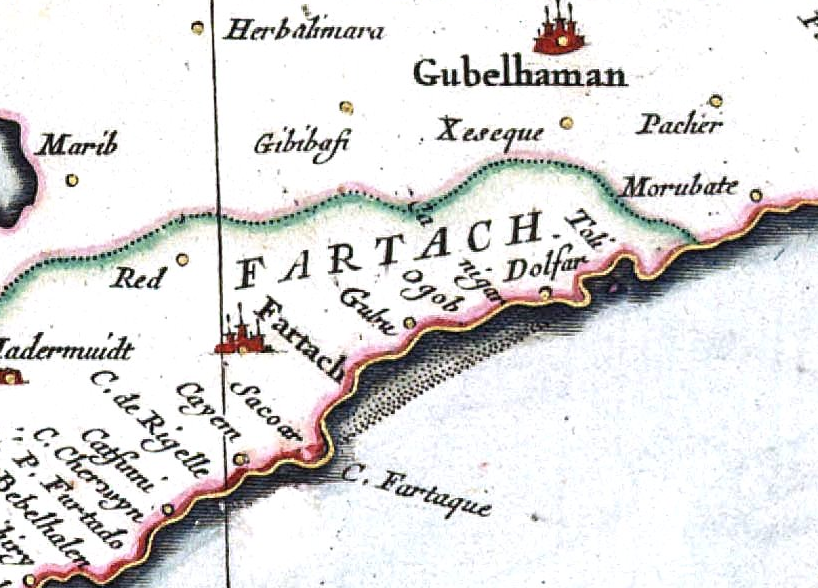
Depiction of the Mahra Sultanate from a 17th-century map. Labeled in the map as "Fartach", in reference to Cape Fartak.

In 1507, a Portuguese fleet commanded by Tristão da Cunha and Afonso de Albuquerque landed on Socotra and, after a bloody battle, seized the main fortress at Suq. Socotra would remain in Portuguese hands until 1511, and was abandoned by the Portuguese due to its poor strategic importance to control the Red Sea.

In 1545, the Kathiri sultan Badr bin Tuwayriq amassed an army and, with support from the Ottoman Turks, conquered Qishn. The Portuguese, who were competing with the Ottomans for control of trade routes in the Red Sea and Indian Ocean, bombarded Qishn and returned it to the Mahris.

=== British protectorate ===
The connection of the British Government with Mahra commenced in 1834, when Captain Ross, of the Indian Navy, was sent on a mission to Mahra, and concluded an agreement with Sultan Ahmed bin Sultan of Fartash and his cousin, Sultan bin Amr of Qishn, by which they consented to the landing and storage of coal on the island by the British Government.

In 1835 negotiations were undertaken through Commander Haines with the Sultan, Amr bin Saad Tawari, for the purchase of the island, and in anticipation of their success a detachment of European and Indian troops was sent to take possession. The Sultan, however, refused to sell the island, or even to cede a portion of it as a coaling depot, and the troops were withdrawn. In 1838 the Chief proposed to farm the island to the British Government, but the capture of Aden, while the proposal was under discussion, rendered it unnecessary to secure Socotra as a coaling station.

Flag of the Mahra Sultanate of Qishn and Socotra, used in the 18th century. It reads in Arabic: "The Afrari Government"

Sultan Amr bin Saad Tawari died about 1845, and was succeeded in the Sultanate of Socotra and Qishn by his nephew, Tawari bin Ali, who in turn was succeeded by his grandson, Ahmed bin Saad. The latter was succeeded by his nephew, Abdulla bin Saad, who was followed by his cousin, Abdulla bin Salim. On the death of the latter he was succeeded by his son, Ali.

In January 1876 an agreement was concluded with the Sultan of Socotra and Qishn, by which, in consideration of a payment of 3,000 dollars and an annual subsidy of 360 dollars, he bound himself, his heirs and successors, never to cede, sell, mortgage, or otherwise give for occupation, save to the British Government, the island of Socotra or any of its dependencies, the neighbouring islands.

In 1886 he accepted a Protectorate Treaty, and bound himself to abstain from all dealings with foreign powers without the previous sanction of the British Government. At the same time he undertook to give immediate notice to the Resident at Aden or other British officer of any attempt by any other power to interfere with Socotra and its dependencies. In 1888 a similar Protectorate Treaty was concluded with Sultan Ali bin Abdulla, as head of the Mahri tribe, and his annual stipend was increased by 120 dollars. In 1898 some of the cargo of the P. and O. S. S. Aden wrecked off Socotra was plundered, and the Sultan was reminded of his obligations under the Agreement of 1876.

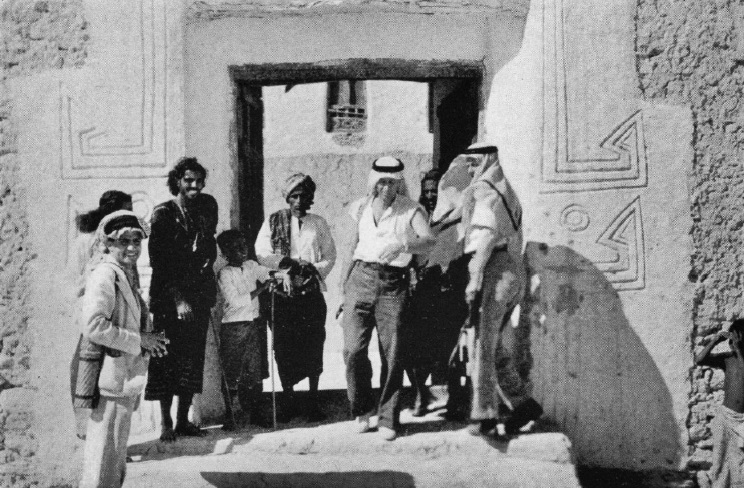
Sultan Ali bin Salim (in the center with a white turban and a sarong) with W. H. Ingrams (far right), late 1930s

Sultan Ali bin Abdulla had three sons, all of whom predeceased him. He died in 1907 and was succeeded by Sultan Abdulla bin Isa, to whom was continued the annual stipend paid to his predecessor. The Sultan of Socotra and Qishn receives a salute of 9 guns, which was made permanent in 1902.

In the 1940s Al-Mahra and its neighbouring regions along the Gulf were forced to sign Advisory Treaties,. Those who refused were subjected to deadly airstrikes delivered by the British Royal Air force. The Advisory Treaty meant that the local leadership no longer had jurisdiction over their internal affairs. The treaty gave the British government complete control over the nation's internal affairs and the order of succession. The Advisory Treaties caused resentment against British rule and the spread of Arab Nationalism in Al-Mahra and the rest of the Arabian Peninsula.

=== The end of the Mahra Sultanate ===
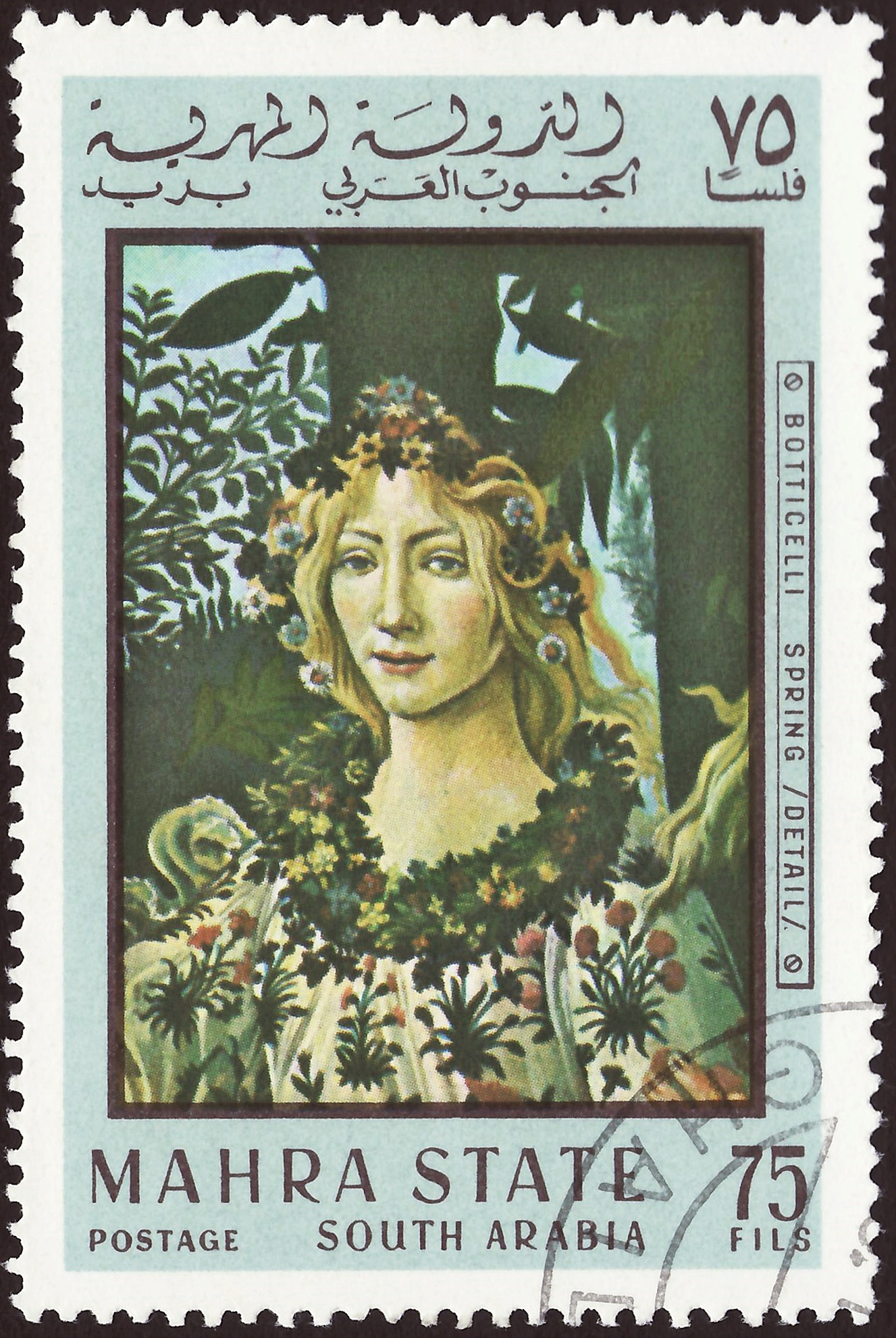
Mahra State stamp issued in 1967, the last year of the state's existence; it depicts Flora from Primavera by Sandro Botticelli, c. 1480

During the 1960s the British sustained losses against various Egypt-sponsored guerrilla forces and the Front for the Liberation of Occupied South Yemen (FLOSY). In 1963 the British government declared a state of emergency in the Aden Protectorate, and by 1967 the British forces had left Yemen as a result of losses against the National Liberation Front (Yemen) which later seized power in Al-Mahra. In 1967, the Al-Mahra sultanate was absorbed by the Marxist People's Republic of South Yemen which itself was an entity heavily sponsored by the Soviets. They put an end to the centuries-old Al-Mahri sultanate. Sultan Isa bin Ali al-Afrar al-Mahri was the last reigning al-Mahri Sultan of Qishn and Socotra.

The sultanate was abolished in 1967 and was annexed by Soviet supported South Yemen, which itself later united with North Yemen to become unified Yemen in 1990. In 2014 the land which was formerly known as the Mahra Sultanate of Qishn and Socotra was absorbed into a new region called Hadramaut.

== Rulers ==
The Sultans of Mahra had the title of Sultan al-Dawla al-Mahriyya (Sultan Qishn wa Suqutra). Their descendants are active politicians nowadays. The Al-Mahra Sultanate was consistently ruled by the Al-Mahri dynasty from year 1750 till 1967.

=== Sultans ===
==== before the 20th century ====
- c. 1750 – 1780: `Afrar al-Mahri
- c. 1780 – 1800: Taw`ari ibn `Afrar al-Mahri
- c. 1800 – 1820: Sa`d ibn Taw`ari Ibn `Afrar al-Mahri
- c. 1834: Sultan ibn `Amr (on Suqutra)
- c. 1834: Ahmad ibn Sultan (at Qishn)
- c. 1835 – 1845: `Amr ibn Sa`d ibn Taw`ari Afrar al-Mahri
- c. 1845 – 18.. Taw`ari ibn `Ali Afrar al-Mahri
- 18.. – 18.. Ahmad ibn Sa`d Afrar al-Mahri
- 18.. – 18.. `Abd Allah ibn Sa`d Afrar al-Mahri
- 18.. – 18.. `Abd Allah ibn Salim Afrar al-Mahri

==== 20th century ====
Name	Lifespan	Reign start	Reign end	Notes	Family	Image
Ali bin Abdullah al-Afrar	? – 1907	19th century	1907		Al-Afrar	
Abdullah bin Isa al-Afrar	? – 6 January 1932	1907	6 January 1932		Al-Afrar	
Ali bin Salim al-Afrar	?	1932	1944	Cousin of Abdullah bin Isa	Al-Afrar	
Hamad bin Abdullah al-Afrar	? –1950	1944	1950	Son of Abdullah bin Isa	Al-Afrar	
Isa bin Ali al-Afrar	1915 – 1977 (aged 62)	1950	30 November 1967	Son of Ali bin Salim. Deposed by the National Liberation Front and remained there until his death.	Al-Afrar	

== Mehri camels ==
Al-Mahra is home to the Mehri camel, which has been an integral part of Al-Mahra army's military success during the Islamic conquests of Egypt and North Africa against the Byzantine Empire. During the conquests the cavalry unit from Al-Mahra introduced the Mehri camel to northern Africa, and now it is found throughout the area. It is better known as the Mehari camel in most of northern Africa, and is sometimes also known as the Sahel camel.

It is a special breed originating in Al-Mahra. They are renowned for their speed, agility and toughness. They have a large but slender physique, and because of its small hump it is perfectly suited for riding.

During the colonial period in northern Africa, the French government took advantage of the Mehri camel's proven military capabilities, and established a camel corps called the Méhariste which was part of the Armée d'Afrique. It patrolled the Sahara using the Mehri camel. The French Méhariste camel corps was part of the Compagnies Sahariennes the French Army of the Levant.

In 1968, France's car maker Citroën introduced the Citroën Méhari, which was a light off-road vehicle named after the famous Mehri camel. The Citroën Méhari was a variant of the Citroën 2CV, and Citroën built more than 144,000 Méhari between 1968 and 1988. A new, 2016 electric model called the Citroën E-Méhari is now being sold in Europe; it is a compact SUV like the Méhari.

== See also ==
- Bin Afrar Palace
