= Qaftat =

- Village
- Location in Oman
- Coordinates: 17°01′N 53°59′E
- Country: Oman
- Governorate: Dhofar Governorate
- Time zone: UTC+4 (Oman Standard Time)

Qaftat (Arabic: قفطات) is a village in the Dhofar Governorate of southwestern Oman. It is located in a coastal area amidst mountains facing the Arabian Sea.

The region experiences a unique monsoon season, called Khareef, which brings greenery and waterfalls to the area between late June and September. Its coastal location suggests that fishing may be a prominent activity for the residents. The area is known for its scenery, and there are beaches, mountains and wadis nearby.

While not a major tourist destination, Qaftat's location in Dhofar makes it a stopover for those exploring the region's natural attractions. The nearby beaches are used for swimming and the mountains offer opportunities for hiking.

Qaftat is accessible by road from other towns in Dhofar. Salalah, the capital of Dhofar, is the closest major city with an airport.
