= Qishn =

Qishn قشن
- Town
- Location in Yemen
- Coordinates: 15°25′18″N 51°40′41″E
- Country: Yemen
- Governorate: Al Mahrah Governorate
- District: Qishn
- Elevation: 38 ft (12 m)

Population (2004)
  - Total: 7,595
- Time zone: UTC+03:00 (AST)

Qishn (Mahri: قشن) is a city in Mahra Governorate which serves as the seat of Qishn District in southern Yemen. Qishn was the historic capital of the Mahra Sultanate and currently serves as the cultural center of the Arabic Mahri people.

== History ==
Historically, Qishn was a port from which incense was exported. The traveller and explorer Freya Stark notes that, "...from Qishn, 200 to 250 tons (of incense, annually)". The port was known to the East India Company as Kisseen.

=== Yemeni civil war ===
Qishn was formerly currently under the control of the Southern Transitional Council (STC) as of the Yemeni civil war.

== Lifestyle ==
Today, the people of Qishn earn most of their income through fishing, farming, or the rearing of livestock.
