= Qurh, Yemen =

Coordinates: 16.72°N 51.47°E

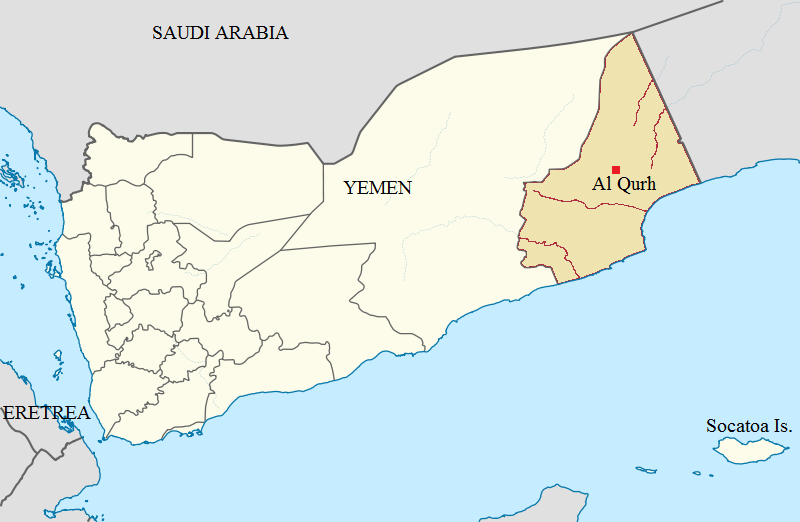
A map showing location of Al Qurh Al Mahrah (Yemen)

Al Qurh is a town in the Al Mahrah region of Yemen, located at 16° 43' N Latitude and 51° 28' E Longitude.

Al Qurh has a desert climate, classified as BWh on the Köppen-Geiger climate classification system. With average annual temperature is 23.9 °C and average annual rainfall is 88 mm.
