= Saleh al-Ja'imlani =

Yemeni military officer

Saleh Mohammed Al-Ja'imlani
- Native name: صالح محمد الجعيملاني
- Allegiance: Yemen
- Branch: Yemeni Land Forces
- Rank: Major General
- Commands: 3rd Mountain Infantry Brigade; 3rd Presidential Protection Brigade; 1st Presidential Protection Brigade; 1st Military Region; 37th Armored Brigade
- Conflicts: Houthi insurgency; Yemeni civil war (2014–present); Houthi takeover in Yemen; 2025 Hadhramaut offensive

Saleh Mohammed Al-Ja'imlani (Note: Arabic: صالح محمد الجعيملاني) is a major general of the Yemeni Land Forces who has served as the commander of the 1st Military Region. Prior to his appointment, Ja'imlani held several positions in the Republican Guard and its successor unit, the Presidential Protection Forces, the latter which he served as its commander. During the Houthi takeover of Yemen, Ja'imlani fled to Aden alongside President Abdrabbuh Mansour Hadi. He was given an advisor role to the Presidential Leadership Council in 2022, and was later transferred to the 1st Military Region in 2024.

== Early life and education ==
Ja'imlani is a native of Abyan. He attended al-Thulaya Institute for military studies, where he graduated from the Battalion Commanders Course in 2003 and the Brigade Commanders Course in 2005. He later a bachelor's degree in military science from the Aden Military College, a master's degree in military science Command and Staff College in Sanaa, and later a Higher War Fellowship Certificate from the Nimeiri Higher Military Academy in Sudan on 29 November 2021.

== Military career ==
During the rule of former president Ali Abdullah Saleh, Ja'imlani had served in and rose through the ranks of the Republican Guard. He was the commander of the 3rd Mountain Infantry Brigade during the Yemeni revolution in 2011, when his forces clashed with Houthi and Islah fighters for nine months as the latter attempted to seize their base in Arhab. On 6 April 2012, Abdrabbuh Mansour Hadi promoted Ja'imlani to the rank of brigadier general and designated him as the commander of the Republican Guard's special protection unit, replacing Tareq Saleh, nephew of former president Saleh. Upon its formation on 6 August 2012, Hadi designated Ja'imlani as the commander of the Presidential Protection Forces, which were the reorganized successor unit to the Republican Guard. He was also appointed the commander of the 3rd Presidential Protection Brigade, and was later simultaneously appointed the commander of the 1st Presidential Protection Brigade in August 2014.

During the Houthi takeover in Yemen, Ja'imlani's Presidential Protection Forces were in charge of guarding the presidential palace in Sanaa when Houthi gunmen raided it on 20 January 2015. Ja’imlani told Associated Press "This is a coup. There is no other word to describe what is happening but a coup." Hadi along with Ja'imlani and his forces retreated to Aden on 21 January. Afterwards, the Houthis named one of their own members as the new commander of the 3rd Presidential Protection Brigade, which had significant importance in the Yemeni military, replacing Ja'imlani.

Upon the formation of the Presidential Leadership Council in 2022, Ja'imlani was appointed to the Supreme Joint Security and Military Committee, which was tasked with advising the PLC on the reorganization of the government security forces under the Ministry of Interior and Ministry of Defense. In December 2024, Ja'imlani was appointed to command the 1st Military Region as well as the 37th Armored Brigade.
