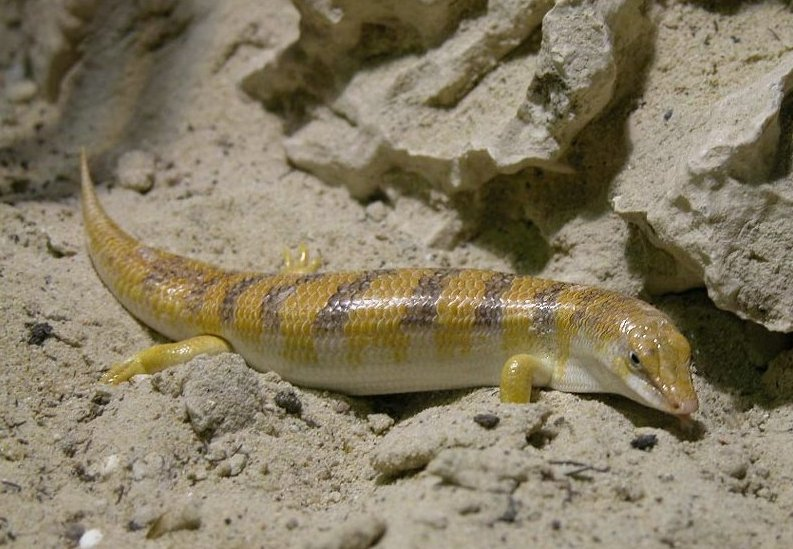
- Scincus scincus, common skink or common sandfish

Scientific classification
- Kingdom: Animalia
- Phylum: Chordata
- Class: Reptilia
- Order: Squamata
- Family: Scincidae
- Subfamily: Scincinae
- Genus: Scincus; Laurenti, 1768

Species
- Five, see text.

= Scincus =

Genus of lizards

Scincus is a genus of skinks, lizards in the family Scincidae. The genus contains four or five species, all of which are typical desert inhabitants, living in sandy and dune-like areas with a hot and dry climate. Species in the genus Scincus can be found from Arabia to the Sahara desert.

== Taxonomy ==
Scincus is the type genus of the subfamily Scincinae. As the subfamily Scincinae appears to be paraphyletic and is in need of revision, it is as yet undetermined which skink genera are closely enough related to Scincus to be retained in the Scincinae. (Austin & Arnold 2006).

== Species ==
The genus Scincus contains five species which are recognized as being valid.

Image	Species	Common name
	Scincus albifasciatus Boulenger, 1890	White-banded sandfish
	Scincus conirostris (Blanford, 1881)	Iranian sandfish
	Scincus hemprichii Wiegmann, 1837	Hemprich's sandfish
	Scincus mitranus Anderson, 1871	Eastern sandfish
	Scincus scincus (Linnaeus, 1758)	Common sandfish

Nota bene: A binomial authority in parentheses indicates that the species was originally described in a genus other than Scincus.
