= Well of Barhout =

Sink hole in Yemen

- Location within Yemen
- Location: Al-Mahara, Yemen
- Coordinates: 17°20′25″N 52°26′38″E
- Depth: 112 m (367 ft)

The Well of Barhout (also nicknamed Well of Hell) is a sinkhole in Al-Mahara, Yemen. It has a circular entrance that measures about 30 m (100 ft) wide at the surface, and it is 112 metres (367 ft) deep.

== Physical features ==
The opening at the top of the Well of Barhout measures 30 metres (98 ft) across, while the bottom of the sinkhole widens to 120 m (380 ft). The sinkhole is 112 m (367 ft) deep and passes through two layers of rock. The top layer is around 61 m (200 ft) in thickness. The top layer is porous and permeable and thus allows water to filter down to the second layer which is less permeable, where it flows into the sinkhole, creating four waterfalls each measuring 46 m (150 ft) in height.

== Exploration ==
It was first explored by the Oman Cave Exploration Team (OCET), who reached the bottom on 15 September 2021. Footage provided to Agence France-Presse (AFP) showed cave formations such as stalagmites and grey and lime-green cave pearls, formed by dripping water. The speleologists reported observing snakes, beetles, lizards, toads and birds as well as dead, decomposing birds and animals, and waterfalls in the cave.

Amateur cave explorers had entered the sinkhole before, but it is not known if anyone had descended to its floor. Reduced oxygen levels were reported. Samples of rock, soil, water, and dead birds were collected from the cave for further analysis. A full report of the team's findings will be made available to the public.

== Folklore ==
Local folklore says the cave was created as a prison for jinn, and superstition has it that objects near the hole can be sucked towards it. Some nearby residents think that it is bad luck to even talk about it.

== See also ==
- Geology of Yemen
