= Huswain district =

Coordinates: 15°40′N 52°00′E

Huswain District حصوين
- District
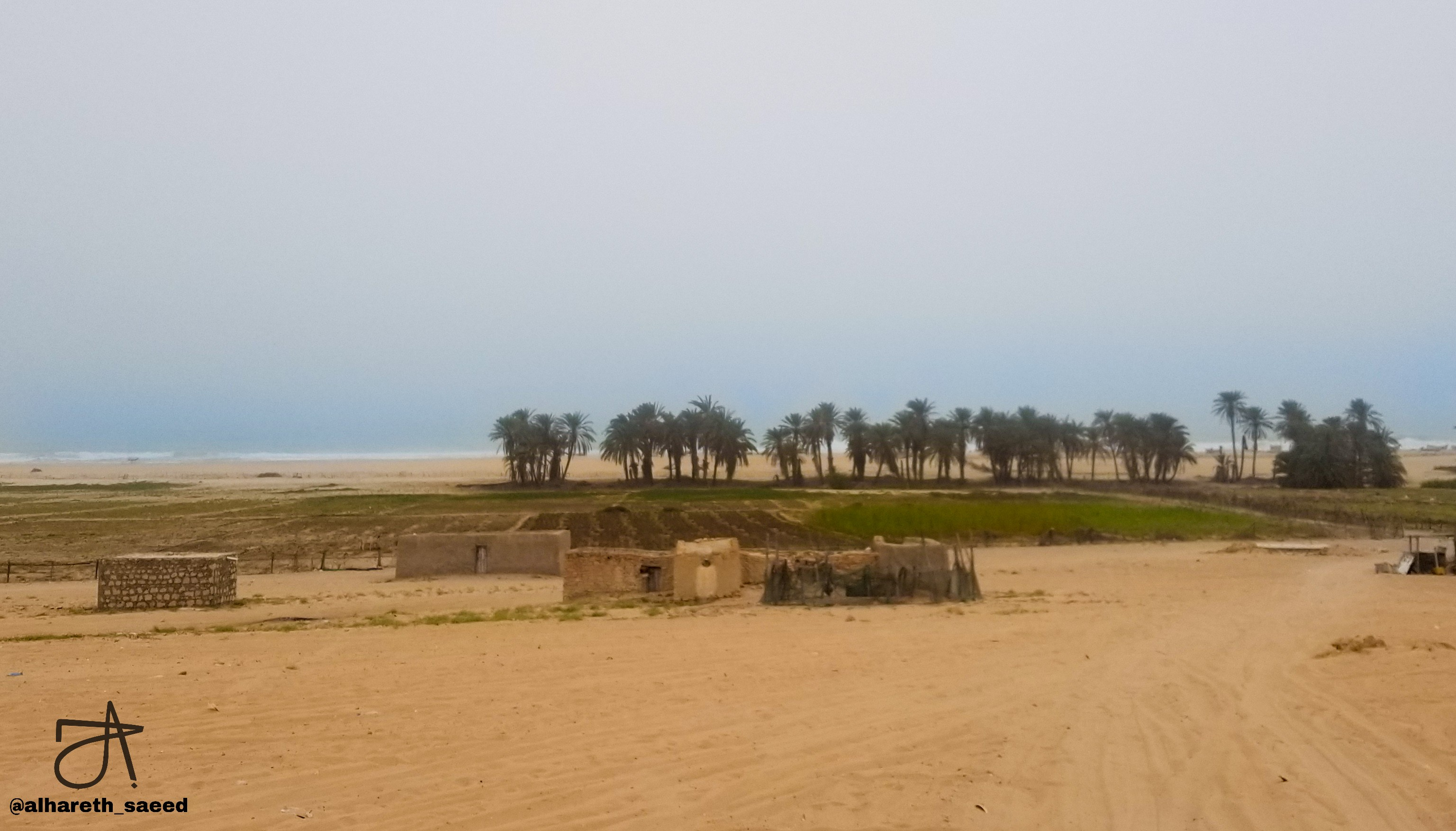
- Judwh - a village in Huswain District
- Interactive map of Huswain District
- Country: Yemen
- Governorate: Al Mahrah

Population (2003)
  - Total: 11,130
- Time zone: UTC+3 (Yemen Standard Time)

Huswain District (Arabic: مديرية حصوين) is a district of the Al Mahrah Governorate, Yemen. As of 2003, the district had a population of 11,130 inhabitants.
