= Mohammed Ali Yaser =

Yemeni politician

Mohammed Ali Yasser

Governor of Al Mahrah Governorate
- Incumbent
- Assumed office 23 February 2020
- President: Abdrabbuh Mansur Hadi, Rashad al-Alimi
- Prime Minister: Maeen Abdulmalik Saeed
- Vice President: Ali Mohsen Saleh, Presidential Leadership Council

Member of the House of Representatives of Yemen
- Incumbent
- Assumed office 27 April 2003

Minister of State, Member of the Cabinet
- In office 2001–2007
- President: Ali Abdullah Saleh
- Prime Minister: Abdul Qadir Bajamal
- Vice President: Abdrabbuh Mansur Hadi

Personal details
- Born: 1964 (age 61–62) Al Mahrah Governorate
- Party: GPC

Mohammed Ali Yaser (Arabic: محمد علي ياسر; born 1964) is a Yemeni politician and MP. He has been serving as governor of Al-Mahara since 23 February 2020.

== Biography ==
He was born in 1964 in al-Mahara, eastern Yemen. He has been a GPC MP since 1997. He held the post of Minister of State, Member of the Cabinet from 2001 to 2007. He was the governor of al-Mahara from 2014 to 2015 and then appointed again as its governor on 23 February 2020.
