= Wilhelm Hemprich =

German naturalist and explorer (1796–1825)

- Born: 24 June 1796; Glatz, Prussia (now Kłodzko, Poland)
- Died: 30 June 1825 (aged 29); Massawa, Eritrea
- Education: University of Breslau, University of Berlin
- Known for: Grundriss der Naturgeschichte
- Scientific career
- Fields: Naturalist, explorer
- Author abbrev. (botany): Hemprich
- Author abbrev. (zoology): Hemprich

Wilhelm Friedrich Hemprich (24 June 1796 – 30 June 1825) was a German naturalist and explorer.

Hemprich was born in Glatz (Kłodzko), Prussian Silesia, and studied medicine at Breslau and Berlin. It was in Berlin that he became friends with Christian Gottfried Ehrenberg, the two men sharing an interest in natural history. Hemprich lectured at Berlin University on comparative physiology, and wrote Grundriss der Naturgeschichte (Compendium of Natural History) (1820). In his spare time he studied reptiles and amphibians at the zoological museum under Hinrich Lichtenstein.

In 1820 Hemprich and Ehrenberg were invited to serve as naturalists on a primarily archeological expedition to Egypt, led by Prussian General von Minutoli. The two naturalists were sponsored by the Berlin Academy. In March 1821 they separated from the main party and travelled up the river Nile to Dongola, the capital of Nubia. They spent the next two years studying the natural history of that part of Egypt.

In 1823 Hemprich and Ehrenberg sailed across the Gulf of Suez to El Tur on the south-west coast of the Sinai peninsula, remaining there for nine months. During this time they visited Mount Sinai, and Ehrenberg became one of the first naturalists to study the marine life of the Red Sea. In 1824 they visited the Lebanon, travelling inland from Beirut to the summit of the Jebel Liban and making their base at Bcharre. In August they returned to Egypt.

In November they set off again along the coasts of the Red Sea, calling at various ports including Jidda. They eventually arrived in the Eritrean port of Massawa, their intention being to visit the highlands of Abyssinia. Unfortunately Hemprich died in Massawa of fever, and Ehrenberg buried him on the island of Toalul. Ehrenberg travelled back to Europe, and in 1828 published an account of their discoveries, under both their names, entitled Symbolae Physicae. The specimens collected by the expedition were deposited at the Museum für Naturkunde Berlin: they included 46,000 botanical specimens of 3000 species and 34,000 animal specimens of 4000 species. These included many new species.

Hemprich is commemorated in the names of the sooty gull (Larus hemprichii ), Hemprich's hornbill (Tockus hemprichii), and the fossil amber pseudoscorpion (Pseudogarypus hemprichii). He is also commemorated in the names of two reptiles: Hemprich's skink (Scincus hemprichii) and Hemprich's coral snake (Micrurus hemprichii).
