= Oman–Yemen relations =

- Oman: Yemen

Oman–Yemen relations refer to bilateral relations between the southern Peninsular Arab nations of Oman and Yemen. The two countries share a 294 km (183 mi) border. Both Oman and Yemen were part of the Persian Empire, and later the Umayyad and Abbasid caliphates. Yemen has an embassy in Muscat. Oman has an embassy in Sanaa. Both countries are members of the Arab League and Organisation of Islamic Cooperation.

== History ==
During the early 1970s, relations between Oman and the neighboring People's Democratic Republic of Yemen (South Yemen) deteriorated, following conflict in Dhofar Province with a guerrilla organization, known from 1974 as the People's Front for the Liberation of Oman, which the South Yemeni government supported. Although a cease-fire was mediated by Saudi Arabia in March 1976, the situation remained tense. The PFLO threat diminished further with the establishment of diplomatic relations in October 1983 between South Yemen and Oman, and South Yemen subsequently lessened propaganda and subversive activities against Oman. In late 1987, Oman opened an embassy in Aden, South Yemen, and appointed its first resident ambassador to the country.

After the Gulf War, rapprochement between united Yemen and neighboring Oman took place. After North and South Yemen merged in May 1990, Oman settled its border disputes with the new united Republic of Yemen on October 1, 1992. Oman also hoped to take part in Yemen's oil development.

In September 2008, the two countries began discussions to form a regional center to combat piracy. In May 2009, Oman signaled support for Yemen's integrity and the government of President Ali Abdullah Saleh by withdrawing the Omani citizenship of southern Yemeni politician Ali Salem al-Bidh, who was believed to be stoking separatist sentiment in south Yemen.

In January 2011, in a preparatory meeting for the second Arab Summit of Economic and Social Development which took place in the Egyptian city of Sharm el-Sheikh, Foreign Minister Abu-Bakr al-Qirbi and Minister Responsible for Foreign Affairs Yusuf bin Abdullah have discussed the bilateral relations between Yemen and Oman and means of boosting them.

During the Yemeni civil war, Oman has been the lone Gulf Cooperation Council (GCC) member to eschew military involvement. According to a paper published by Georgetown University, the Omanis fear the disability in Yemen due to the civil war. However, according to the paper, the Omanis see in Yemen an opportunity to project independence from Saudi Arabia. According to Al Jazeera, Omani diplomats have worked to mediate relations between the Saudi government and the Houthi movement.
