= Scincus hemprichii =

Conservation status
- Least Concern (IUCN 3.1)

Scientific classification
- Kingdom: Animalia
- Phylum: Chordata
- Class: Reptilia
- Order: Squamata
- Family: Scincidae
- Genus: Scincus
- Species: S. hemprichii

Binomial name
- Scincus hemprichii Wiegmann, 1837

Species of reptile

Scincus hemprichii is a species of lizard in the family Scincidae. The species is native to the Arabian Peninsula.

== Etymology ==
The specific name, hemprichii, is in honor of German naturalist Wilhelm Friedrich Hemprich.

== Geographic range ==
S. hemprichii is found in Saudi Arabia and Yemen.

== Habitat ==
The preferred natural habitat of S. hemprichii is sandy desert.

== Behavior ==
S. hemprichii is terrestrial and nocturnal.

== Reproduction ==
The mode of reproduction of S. helmichii is unknown.
