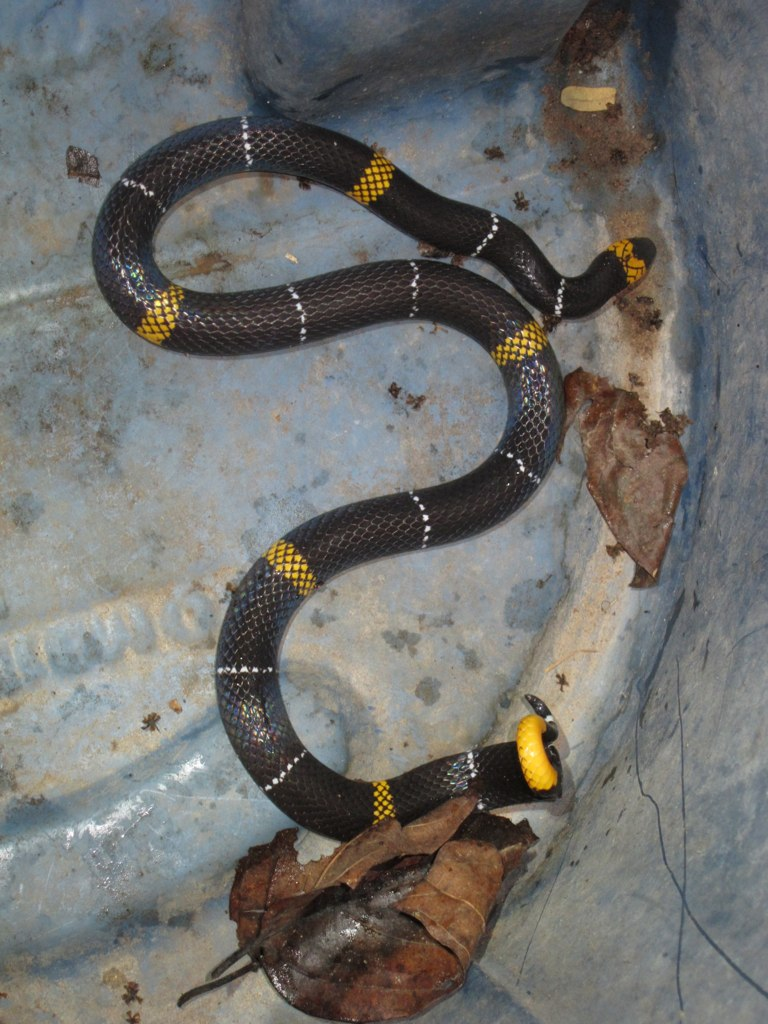

Conservation status
- Least Concern (IUCN 3.1)

Scientific classification
- Kingdom: Animalia
- Phylum: Chordata
- Class: Reptilia
- Order: Squamata
- Suborder: Serpentes
- Family: Elapidae
- Genus: Micrurus
- Species: M. hemprichii

Binomial name
- Micrurus hemprichii (Jan, 1858)
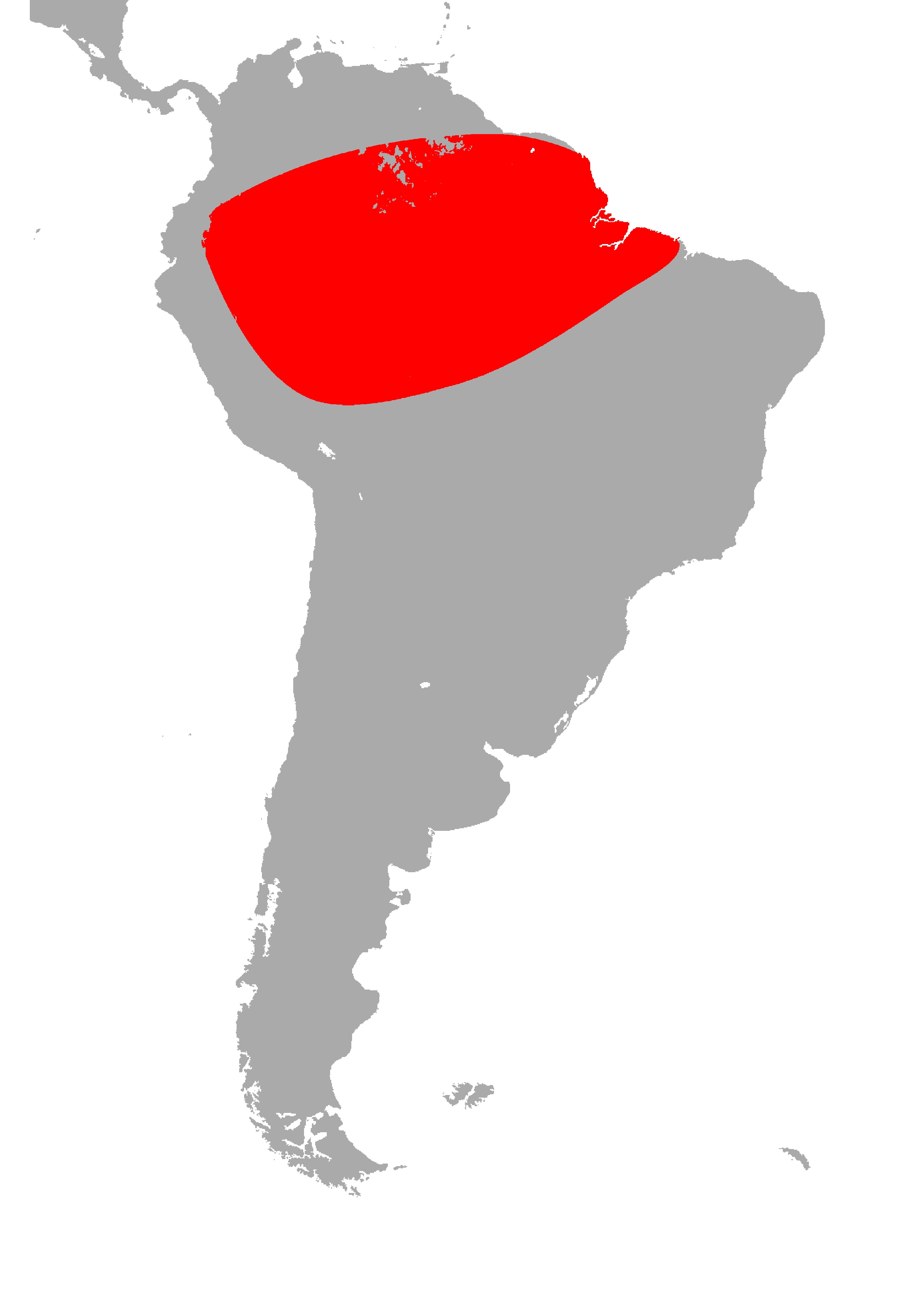

Synonyms
- Elaps hemprichii Jan, 1858

= Micrurus hemprichii =

Species of snake

Micrurus hemprichii, commonly known as Hemprich's coral snake, the orange-banded coral snake, and the worm-eating coral snake, is a species of venomous snake in the family Elapidae. The species is native to northern South America. There are two recognized subspecies.

== Local common names ==
Local common names for Micrurus hemprichii include cobra coral lombrigueira in Brazilian Portuguese and coral lombricera in South American Spanish.

== Etymology ==
The specific name, hemprichii, is in honor of German naturalist Wilhelm Friedrich Hemprich.

== Description ==
As in many species of coral snakes, the color pattern of Micrurus hemprichii includes triads of black rings separated by white rings. However, unlike in other coral snakes, the black rings of the triads are very wide, and the white rings are very narrow. Also, the colored rings between the triads are relatively narrow and orange instead of being wide and red. Unlike in all other species of the genus Micrurus, in M. hemprichii the anal plate is undivided.

== Habitat ==
The preferred natural habitat of Hemprich's coral snake is forest at elevations below 1,000 metres (3,300 ft), including lower montane wet forest, gallery forest, and primary and secondary rain forest. It is a cryptic species living in leaf litter of the forest floor.

== Behavior ==
Micrurus hemprichii is terrestrial and primarily fossorial.

== Diet ==
Hemprich's coral snake preys predominately upon velvet worms, but also on small snakes and amphisbaenids.

== Geographic distribution ==
Micrurus hemprichii is found in the upper Amazon Basin, Guiana Highlands, and upper Orinoco Basin in Bolivia, Brazil, Colombia, Ecuador, French Guiana, Guyana, Peru, Suriname, and Venezuela.

== Subspecies ==
Two subspecies are recognized as being valid.

- Micrurus hemprichii hemprichii (Jan, 1858)
- Micrurus hemprichii ortoni Schmidt, 1953

Nota bene: A trinomial authority in parentheses indicates that the subspecies was originally described in a genus other than Micrurus.
