= Man'ar district =

Coordinates: 16°15′N 51°20′E

Man'ar District
- District
- Interactive map of Man'ar District
- Country: Yemen
- Governorate: Al Mahrah

Population (2003)
  - Total: 5,388
- Time zone: UTC+3 (Yemen Standard Time)

Man'ar District is a district of the Al Mahrah Governorate, Yemen. As of 2003, the district had a population of 5,388 inhabitants.
