= Hat district =

Coordinates: 17°10′N 51°25′E

Hat District
- District
- Interactive map of Hat District
- Country: Yemen
- Governorate: Al Mahrah

Population (2003)
  - Total: 2,786
- Time zone: UTC+3 (Yemen Standard Time)

Hat District is a district of the Al Mahrah Governorate, Yemen. As of 2003, the district had a population of 2,786 inhabitants.
