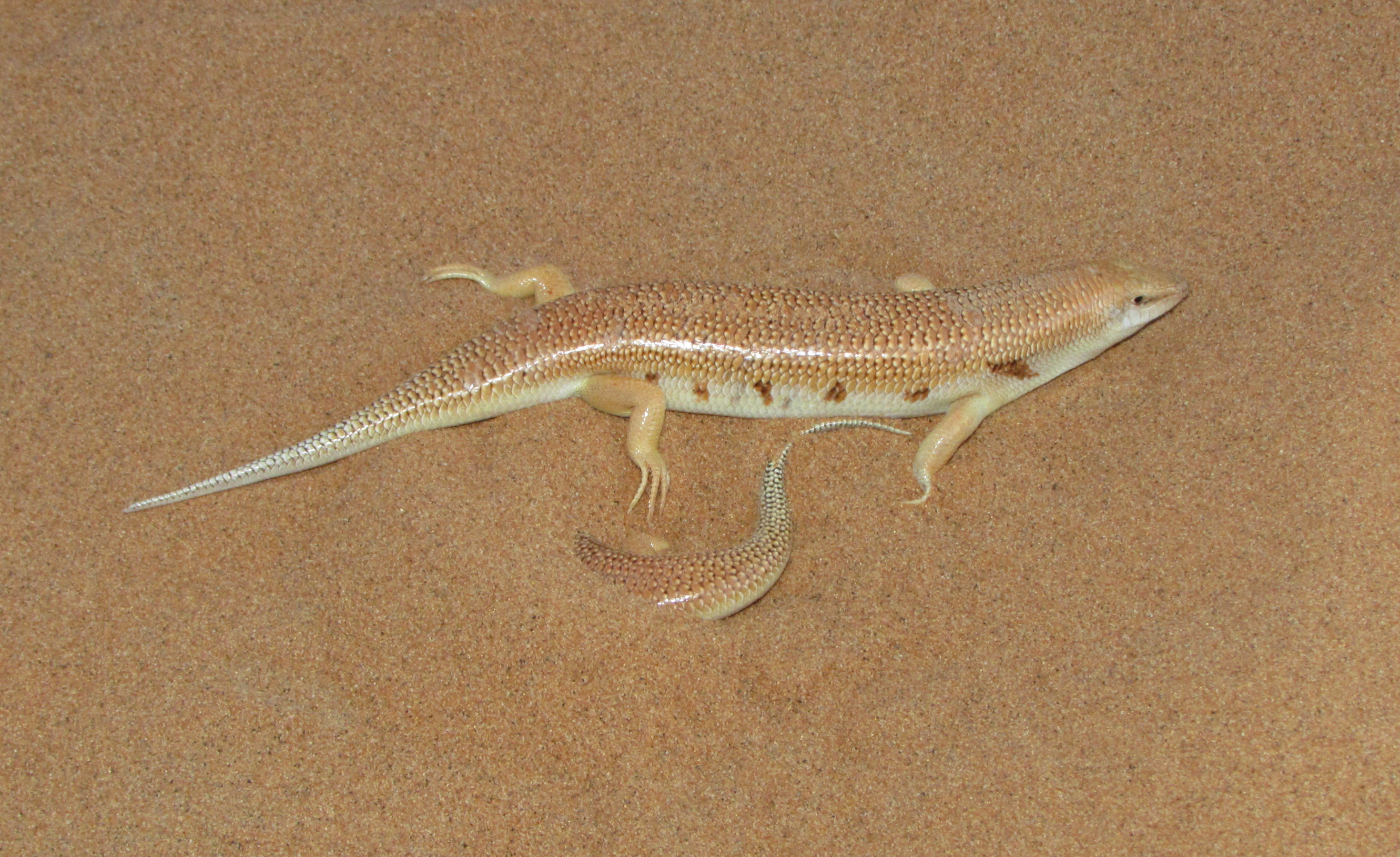

Conservation status
- Least Concern (IUCN 3.1)

Scientific classification
- Kingdom: Animalia
- Phylum: Chordata
- Class: Reptilia
- Order: Squamata
- Suborder: Scinciformata
- Infraorder: Scincomorpha
- Family: Scincidae
- Genus: Scincus
- Species: S. albifasciatus

Binomial name
- Scincus albifasciatus Boulenger, 1890

= Scincus albifasciatus =

Species of reptile

Scincus albifasciatus is a species of lizard which is found in Senegal, Mauritania, Algeria, and Western Sahara.
