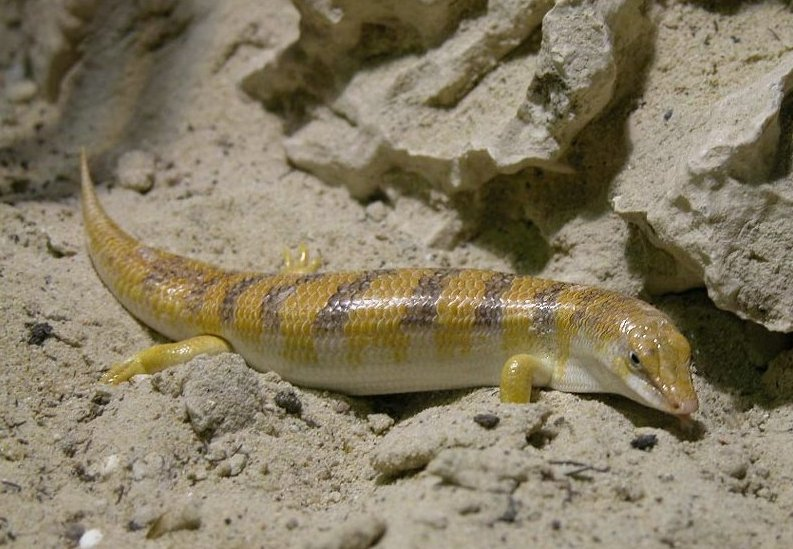

Conservation status
- Least Concern (IUCN 3.1)

Scientific classification
- Kingdom: Animalia
- Phylum: Chordata
- Class: Reptilia
- Order: Squamata
- Family: Scincidae
- Genus: Scincus
- Species: S. scincus

Binomial name
- Scincus scincus (Linnaeus, 1758)

= Scincus scincus =

Species of lizard

Scincus scincus, also commonly known as the sandfish skink, common sandfish or common skink, is a species of skink notable for its burrowing or swimming behaviour in sand. It is native to the Sahara Desert and the Arabian Peninsula, but is also kept as a pet elsewhere.

== Description ==
The name Algerian sandfish originated because of its ability to move through sand as if it were swimming. Adult common skinks usually reach about 20 cm (7.9 inches) in length, including the short tail.

The common skink has developed a unique way of dealing with the desert heat: it can dive into loose, soft sand. Its winding movements produce vibrations in the sand, with a consistent frequency of 3 Hz. It does this to prevent its body from overheating and to escape potential predators, such as the Saharan sand viper (Cerastes vipera).

This skink has a long, wedge-shaped snout with a countersunk lower jaw, shaped much like a basket. Its compact, tapered body is covered with smooth, shiny scales that may appear oily to the untrained eye, and its legs are short and sturdy with long, flattened and fringed shovel-like feet. The tail is short, tapering to a fine point. The coloration of this species is considered attractive, being yellow-caramel with brown-black cross bands. This lizard also has bead-like eyes so it can close them to keep sand out of its eyes. Similarly, its nostrils are very small to keep all of the sand out of its nose and lungs.

The skink plays a small yet significant role in 13th century Islamic mythology originating in Algeria. To this day, nomadic tribes of the region believe that the skink's ability to avoid predators by diving into sand is a blessing that protects them from dangers of the desert and often keep the animal as a pet.

X-ray imaging has demonstrated the lizard swims within sand using an undulatory gait with its limbs tucked against its sides rather than use its limbs as paddles to propel itself forward. Subsequent studies of the mathematics of sandfish sand-swimming, using robotic models, and electromyography show that the sandfish uses the optimum waveform to move through the sand with minimal energetic cost, given its anatomy.

To further support their title as a "sand-fish," these lizards are able to breathe even when completely submerged in the desert sand. They breathe the tiny pockets of air between grains of sand, and a specially-formed respiratory tract catches inhaled particles before they reach the lungs. These particles are then expelled via sneezing.

== Range ==
Common skink burrowing into sand

Species in the Scincus genus are distributed over an extensive belt of desert from the west coast of Africa, through the Sahara and into Arabia.

== Diet ==
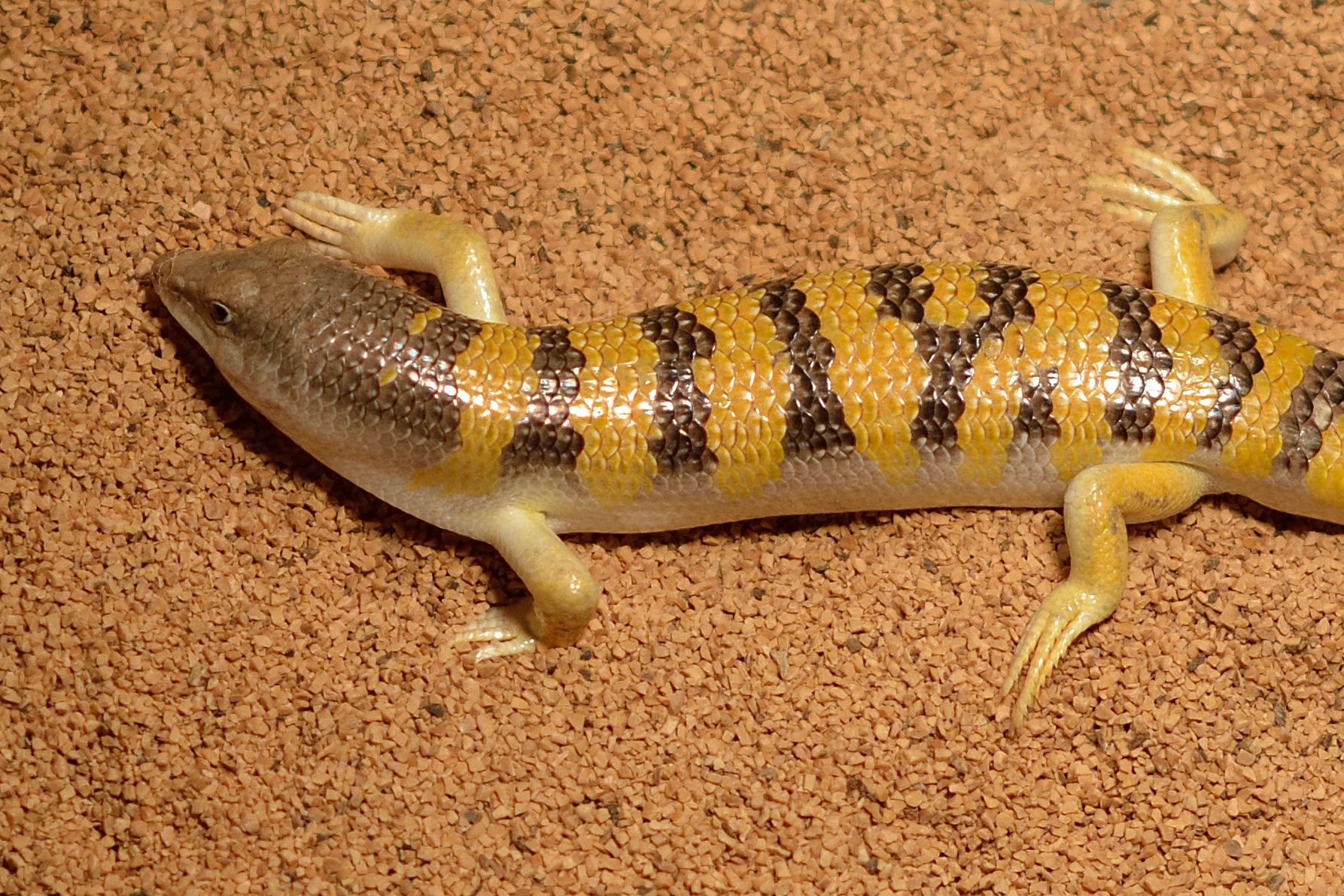
A captive juvenile male common skink.

The sandfish skink is an insectivore. Sandfish have a diet of dubias, crickets, and mealworms. It can detect vibrations that nearby insects create while moving, using those vibrations to locate, ambush, and consume them.

== Hardiness ==
Sandfish are resilient creatures, since they occupy one of the most inhospitable places to live on Earth. They live comfortably in temperatures of 32 to 54 °C or 90 to 130 °F.

== Relatives ==
The sandfish has around 6 or 7 morphs. The sandfish is very similar to Peters's banded skink, a less wedge-nosed skink with different hands that are more similar to a blue tongue skink than a sandfish.
