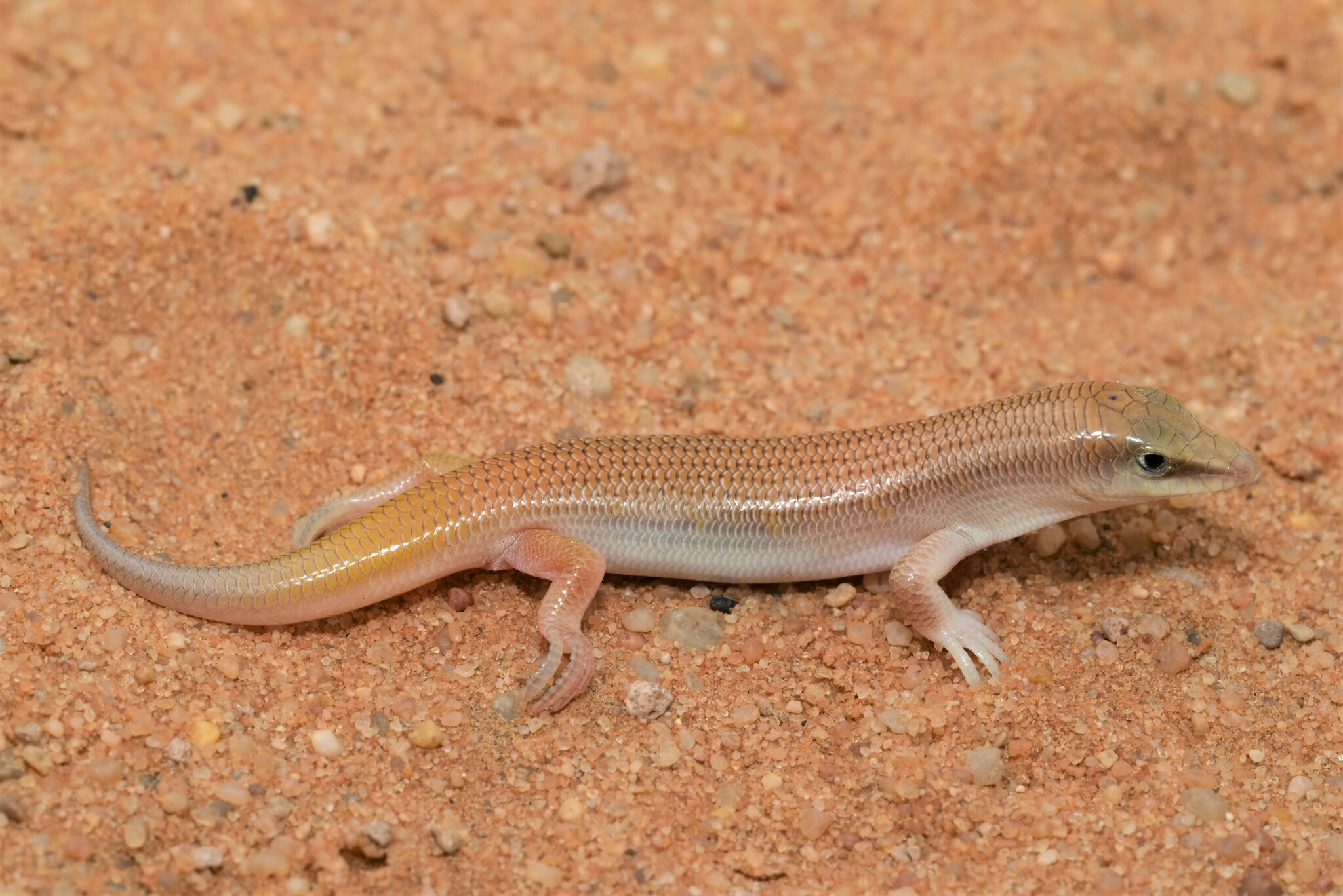

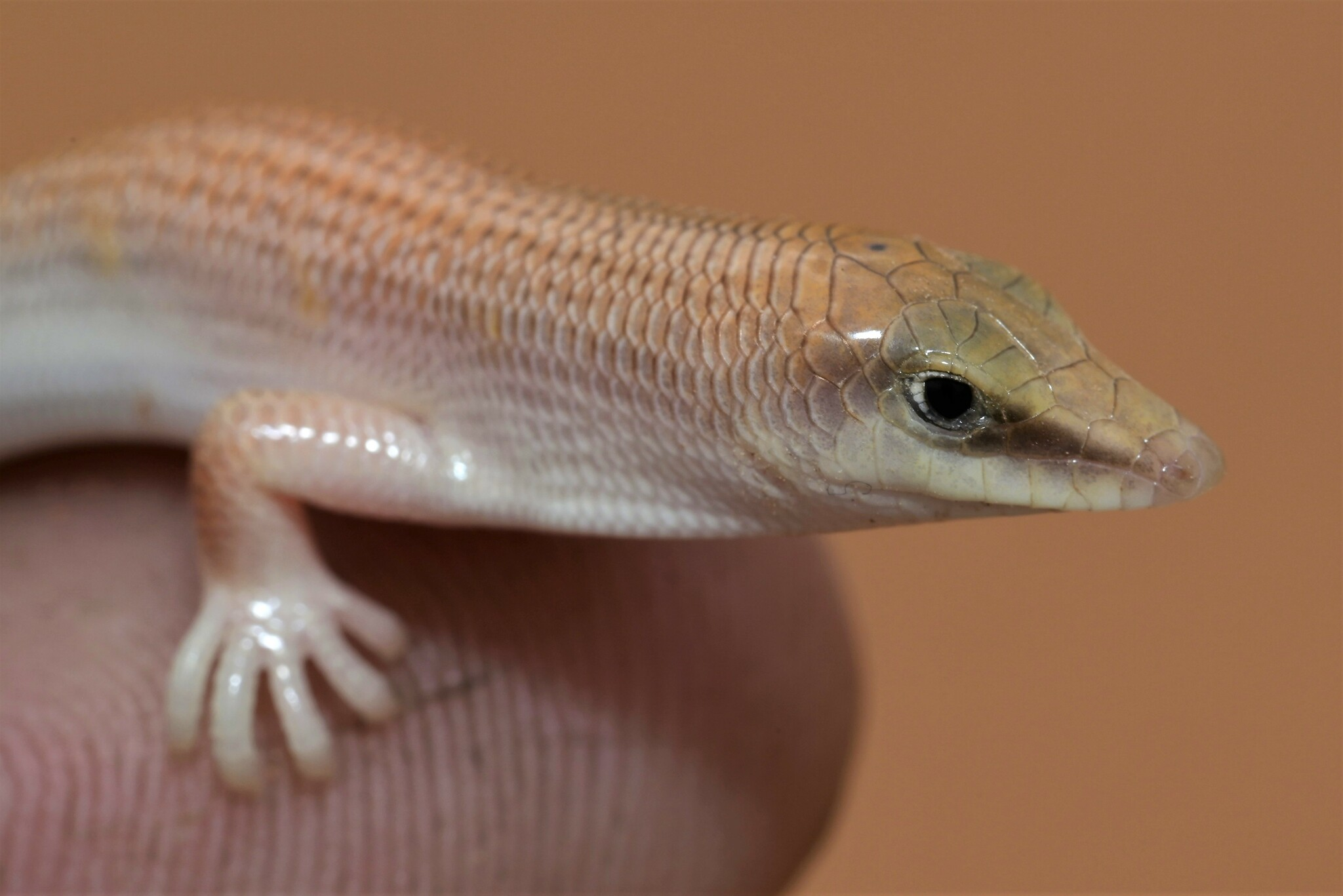

Scientific classification
- Kingdom: Animalia
- Phylum: Chordata
- Class: Reptilia
- Order: Squamata
- Family: Scincidae
- Genus: Scincus
- Species: S. conirostris

Binomial name
- Scincus conirostris Blanford, 1881

= Scincus conirostris =

Species of reptile

Scincus conirostris, a type of sandfish skink, is a species of lizard in the skink family, Scincidae, found in Iran, Oman, Saudi Arabia and the United Arab Emirates.
