= Al-Mazyunah =

Al-Mazyunah المزيونة Al-Mazyona, Al Mazyoona
- Wilayat
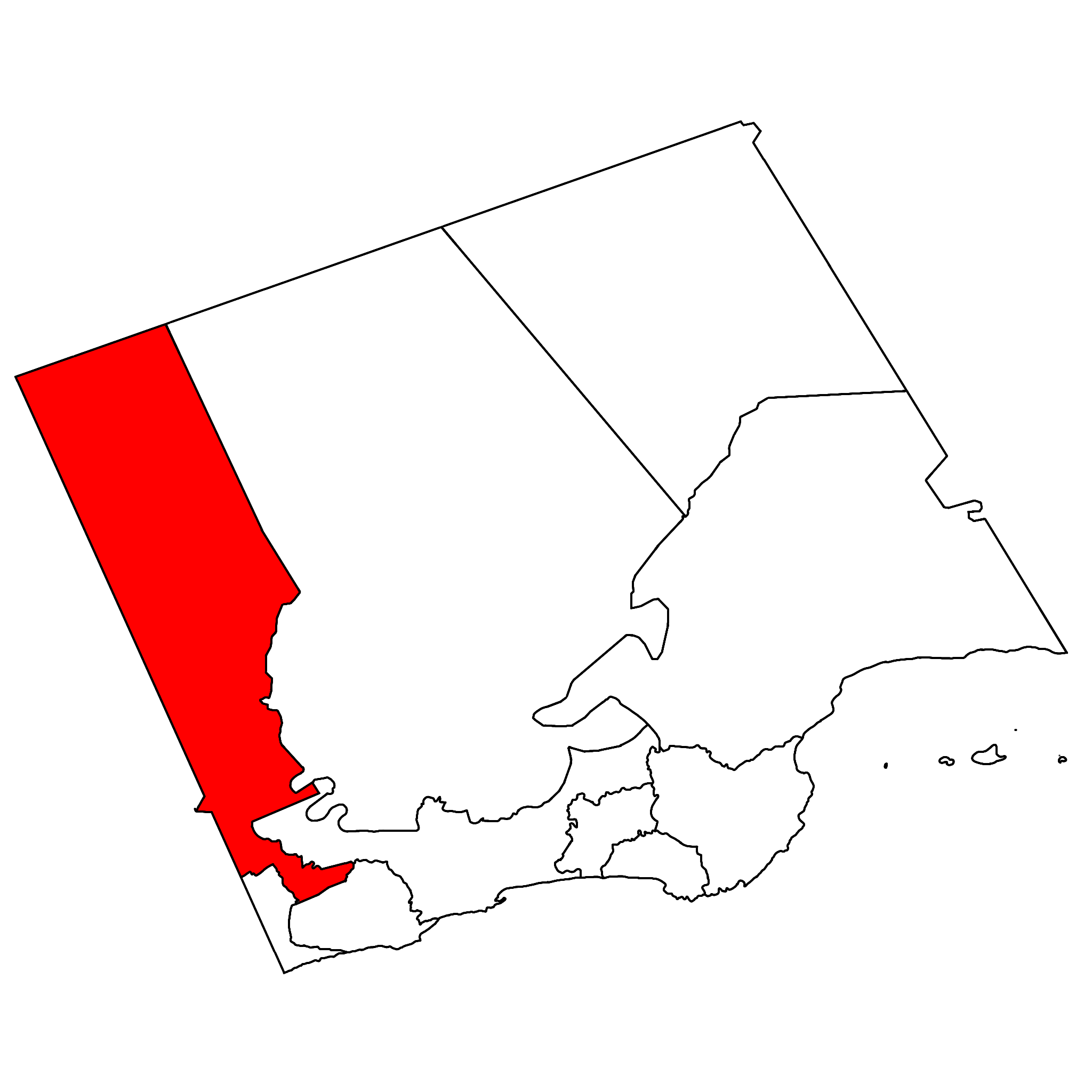
- Wilayat of Al-Mazyunah in the Dhofar Goverorate

- Location on the Oman–Yemen border
- Coordinates: 17°50′55″N 52°37′12″E
- Country: Oman
- Governorate: Dhofar

Al-Mazyunah (Al-Mazyona or Al Mazyoona) is a wilayah (province) of Dhofar in Oman, near the border with Yemen. There is an international border checkpoint at Al-Mazyunah.

As of 2020, the population was 8,415.
