= Arma district, Yemen =

Coordinates: 15.4125°N 47.2344°E

Arma District مديرية عرماء
- District
- Interactive map of Arma District
- Country: Yemen
- Governorate: Shabwah

Population (2003)
  - Total: 10,188
- Time zone: UTC+3 (Yemen Standard Time)

Arma District (Arabic: مديرية عرماء) is a district of the Shabwah Governorate in Yemen. As of 2003, the district had a population of 10,188 inhabitants.
