= Thamud district =

Coordinates: 17°00′N 49°50′E

Thamud District مديرية ثمود
- District
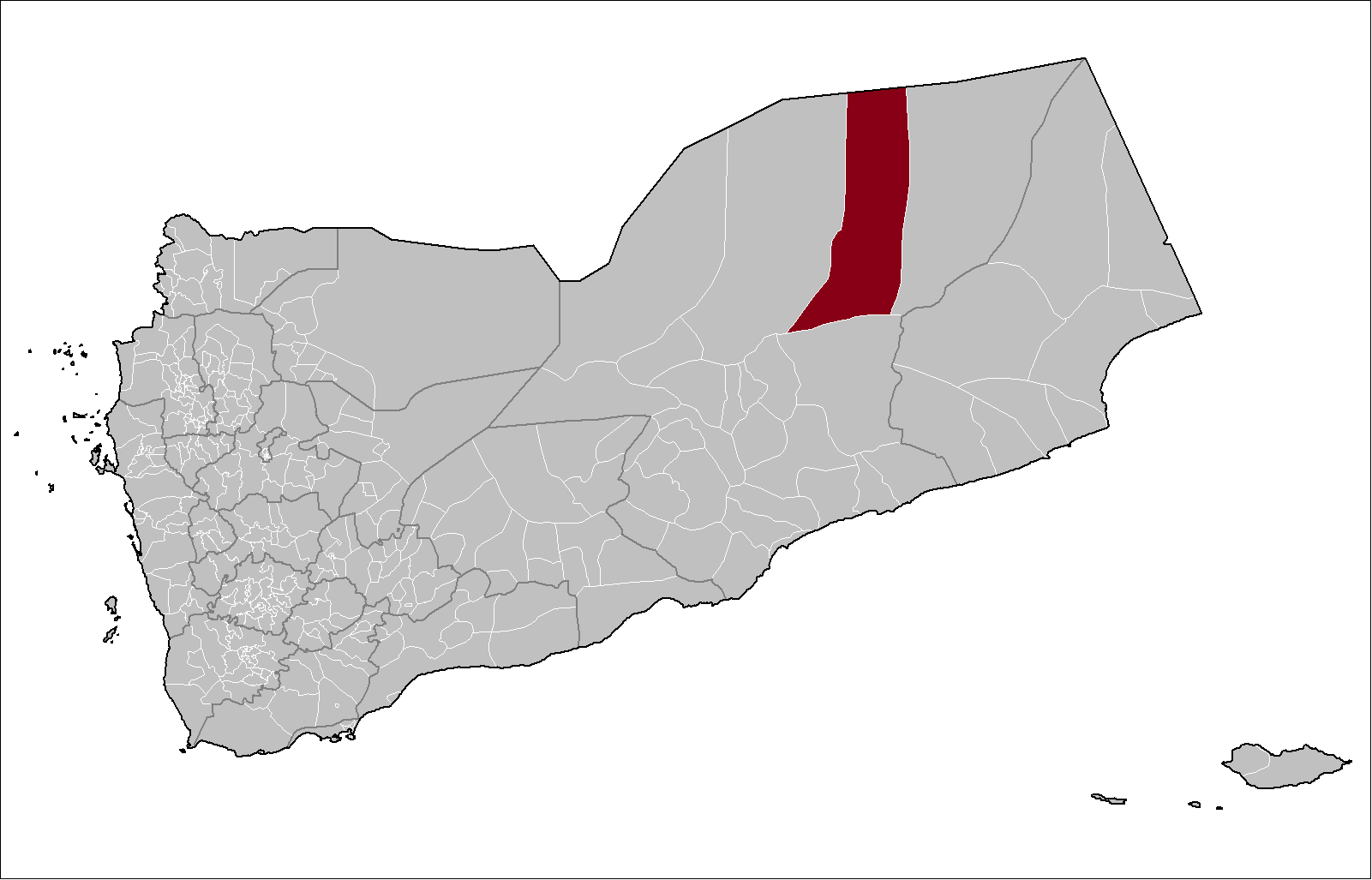
- The district highlighted in Yemen
- Country: Yemen
- Governorate: Hadhramaut

Population (2021)
  - Total: 7,012
- Time zone: UTC+3 (Yemen Standard Time)

Thamud District (Arabic: مديرية ثمود) is a district of the Hadhramaut Governorate, Yemen. As of 2021, the district had a population of 7,012 inhabitants.

== Climate ==
Climate data for Thamud
| Month | Jan | Feb | Mar | Apr | May | Jun | Jul | Aug | Sep | Oct | Nov | Dec | Year |
|---|---|---|---|---|---|---|---|---|---|---|---|---|---|
| Mean daily maximum °C (°F) | 23.4 (74.1) | 25.1 (77.2) | 28.0 (82.4) | 30.8 (87.4) | 33.5 (92.3) | 35.1 (95.2) | 33.8 (92.8) | 33.5 (92.3) | 32.6 (90.7) | 30.2 (86.4) | 27.1 (80.8) | 24.7 (76.5) | 29.8 (85.7) |
| Mean daily minimum °C (°F) | 12.2 (54.0) | 13.9 (57.0) | 16.6 (61.9) | 19.2 (66.6) | 22.2 (72.0) | 23.4 (74.1) | 23.0 (73.4) | 22.8 (73.0) | 21.6 (70.9) | 17.7 (63.9) | 14.7 (58.5) | 13.4 (56.1) | 18.4 (65.1) |
| Average precipitation mm (inches) | 18 (0.7) | 12 (0.5) | 15 (0.6) | 16 (0.6) | 4 (0.2) | 0 (0) | 0 (0) | 1 (0.0) | 0 (0) | 1 (0.0) | 9 (0.4) | 14 (0.6) | 90 (3.5) |
Source: Climate-data.org
