= As Sawm district =

As Sawm District مديرية السوم
- District
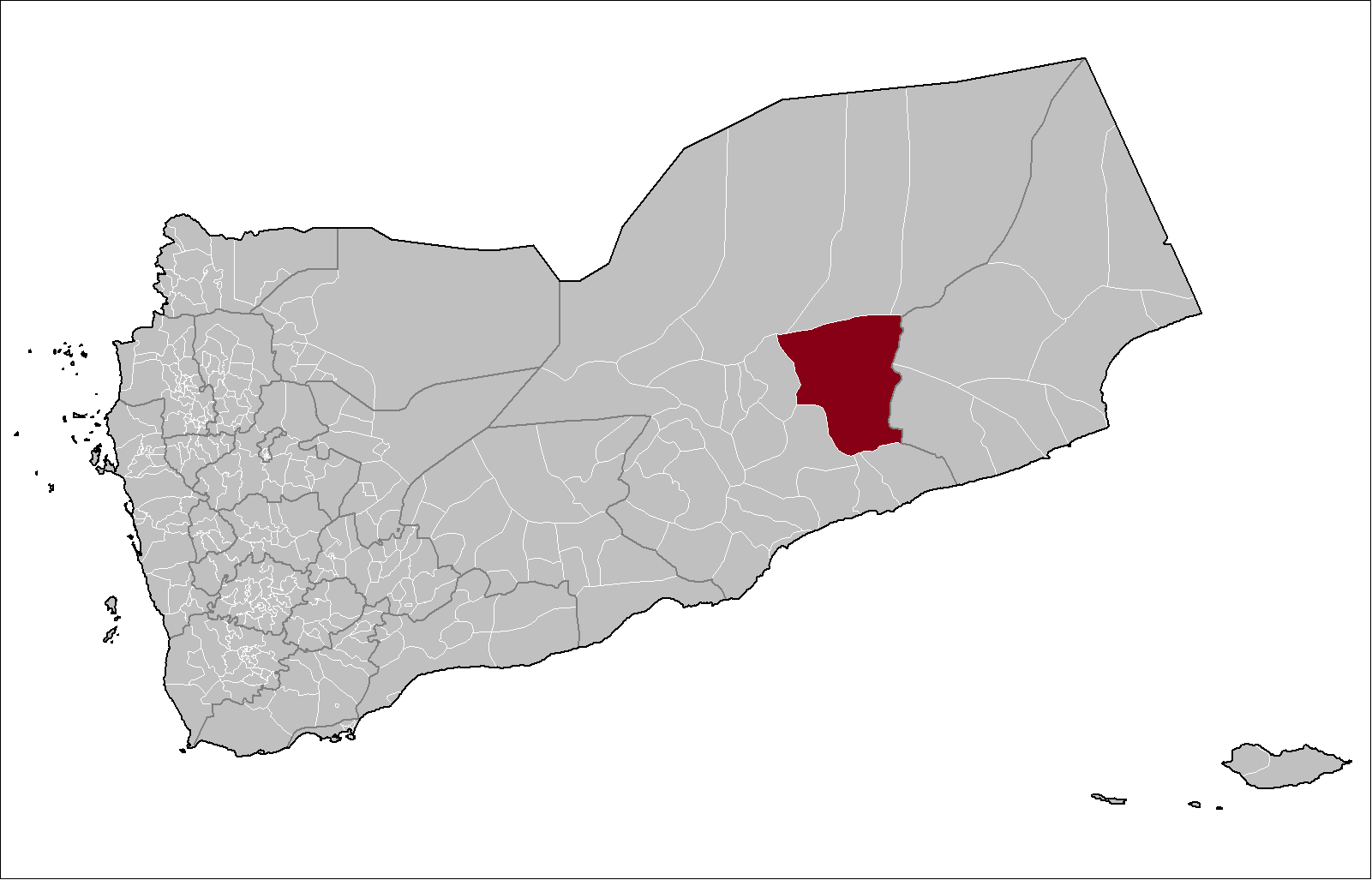
- The district highlighted in Yemen
- Coordinates: 16°00′N 50°00′E
- Country: Yemen
- Governorate: Hadhramaut Governorate

Population (2021)
  - Total: 19,842
- Time zone: UTC+3 (Yemen Standard Time)

As Sawm District (Arabic: مديرية السوم) is a district of the Hadhramaut Governorate, Yemen. As of 2021, the district had a population of 19,842 people.
