= Al Masilah district =

Al Masilah District مديرية المسيلة
- District
- Location in Yemen
- Coordinates: 15°30′N 51°00′E
- Country: Yemen
- Governorate: Al Mahrah

Population (2003)
  - Total: 10,404
- Time zone: UTC+3 (Yemen Standard Time)

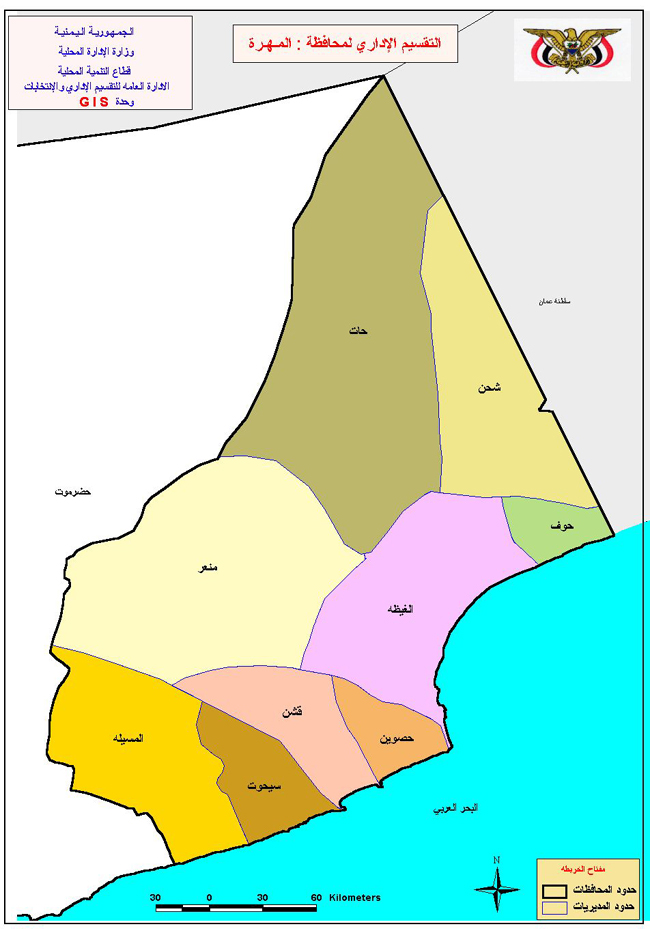
Map showing Al Masilah District within Al Mahrah Governorate

Al Masilah District is a district of the Al Mahrah Governorate, Yemen. As of 2003, the district had a population of 10,404 inhabitants.
