= Sayhut district =

Coordinates: 15°20′N 51°20′E

Sayhut District
- District
- Interactive map of Sayhut District
- Country: Yemen
- Governorate: Al Mahrah

Population (2003)
  - Total: 11,746
- Time zone: UTC+3 (Yemen Standard Time)

Sayhut District is a district of the Al Mahrah Governorate, Yemen. As of 2003, the district had a population of 11,746 inhabitants.
