= Khashamir =

- Interactive map of Khashamir
- Country: Yemen
- Governorate: Hadhramaut Governorate
- Time zone: UTC+3 (Yemen Standard Time)

Khashamir is a village in Yemen, located in Hadhramaut Governorate at approximately 15.54°N 48.35°E. It observes Yemen Standard Time (UTC+3).

A local man sued the United States government for killing his relatives in a 2012 drone strike.
