= Shahan district =

Coordinates: 17°35′N 52°20′E

Shahan District مديرية شحن
- District
- Interactive map of Shahan District
- Country: Yemen
- Governorate: Al Mahrah

Population (2003)
  - Total: 3,152
- Time zone: UTC+3 (Yemen Standard Time)

Shahan District (Arabic: مديرية شحن) is a district of the Al Mahrah Governorate, Yemen. As of 2003, the district had a population of 3,152 inhabitants.
