= Sah district =

Coordinates: 15°25′N 49°00′E

Sah District
- District
- Interactive map of Sah District
- Country: Yemen
- Governorate: Hadhramaut Governorate

Population (2021)
  - Total: 37,210
- Time zone: UTC+3 (Yemen Standard Time)

Sah District is a district of the Hadhramaut Governorate, Yemen. In 2021, the district had a population of 37,210.
