= Qishn district =

Coordinates: 15°30′N 51°35′E

Qishn District قاشن قشن
- District
- Interactive map of Qishn District
- Country: Yemen
- Governorate: Al Mahrah

Population (2003)
  - Total: 11,441
- Time zone: UTC+3 (Yemen Standard Time)

Qishn District is a district of the Al Mahrah Governorate, Yemen. As of 2003, the district had a population of 11,441 inhabitants.
