= Khareef =

Arabic term for the southeastern monsoon

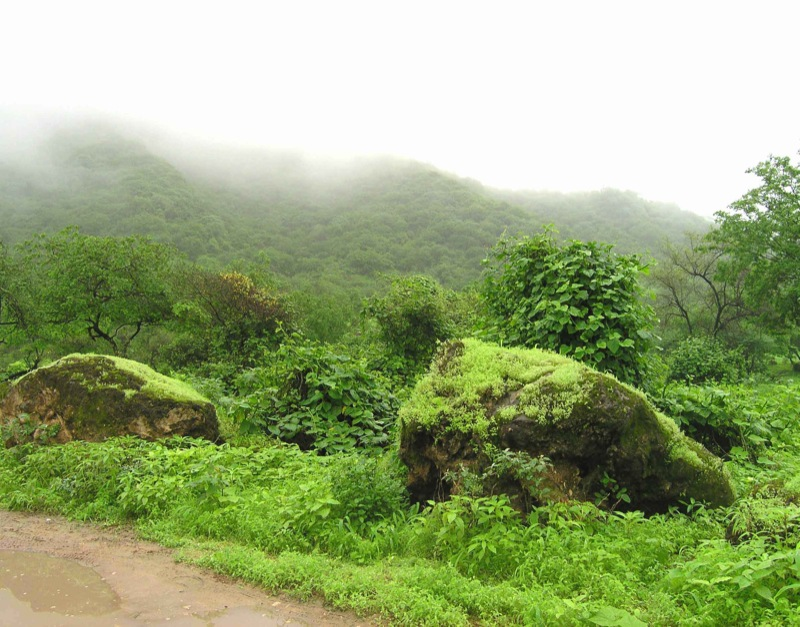
During the khareef, the Dhofar Mountains around Salalah and Al-Hawf are rainsoaked and shrouded in fog

Khareef (Arabic: خَرِيْف, romanized: Kharīf, lit. 'autumn') is a colloquial Arabic term used in Oman, southeastern Yemen, southwestern Saudi Arabia and Sudan for the southeastern monsoon. The monsoon affects Dhofar and Al Mahrah Governorates from about June to early September. During these middle months every year, sufficient cold upwelling develops in near-shore waters of the Arabian Sea to hold sea surface temperatures in the low to mid twenties Celsius, while high twenties prevail further offshore. Warm humid air blowing onshore from the central Arabian Sea passes over that cooler water and is chilled until fog and precipitation condense. Towns such as Salalah depend upon the khareef for their water supply. An annual Khareef festival is held in Salalah to celebrate the monsoon and attracts tourists.

The Khareef leads to a unique ecological habitat along the coast known as the Arabian Peninsula coastal fog desert.
