= Al-Mahrah Governorate =

Governorate of Yemen

Coordinates: 16°48′N 51°44′E

Al-Mahrah المَهْرَة (Arabic)
- Governorate
- Al-Mahra Governorate
- Country: Yemen
- Capital city: Al Ghaydah

Government
  - Governor: Mohammed Ali Yaser

Area
  - Total: 67,297 km^{2} (25,984 sq mi)
- Highest elevation: 1,300 m (4,300 ft)

Population (2004)
  - Total: 88,594
  - Density: 1.3165/km^{2} (3.4096/sq mi)

Al-Mahrah (Arabic: ٱلْمَهْرَة al-Mahrah), or simply Mahra, is the easternmost governorate (muhafazah) of Yemen, situated in the southern part of the Arabian Peninsula. Bordered by Oman to the east and the Rub' al Khali desert to the north, it is often referred to as the country's "Eastern Gateway." Its capital is Al Ghaydah, and it remains the least populated governorate in Yemen, accounting for only 0.5% of the national population.

Al-Mahrah has a 500-kilometer coastline along the Arabian Sea, a rugged central mountain plateau reaching elevations of 1,300 metres (4,300 ft), and the Rub' al Khali desert dunes to the north. The region is ecologically unique to the rest of the Arabian Peninsula due to the seasonal monsoon, or Khareef season, which transforms the coastal mountains of the Hawf District into lush, verdant forests and valleys.

A significant portion of the Mahris speak the Mehri language, a modern South Arabian language, in addition to Arabic as their primary tongue. The Mahri people are traditionally regarded as descendants of the ancient ʿĀd kingdom. Historically, the region was a center for the frankincense trade and played a pivotal role in early Islamic military history, contributing elite cavalry to the Muslim conquest of Egypt and the Maghreb.

Al-Mahrah relies heavily on fishing, livestock breeding, and cross-border trade through the Port of Nishtun and various land crossings into Oman. While the governorate has remained relatively stable and largely isolated from the direct violence of the Yemeni Civil War, it has seen an increased Saudi Arabian military and political presence since late 2017.

== History ==
=== Ancient history ===
The ancient history of the Mahra region begins with the formation of the ʿĀd kingdom by an Arabian tribe called ʿĀd which settled in South Arabia. The Mehri people are traditionally considered descendants of the ʿĀd Kingdom and blood relatives of the Thamud. According to Islamic genealogies, the forefather of the Mehri people was Ya'rub, the son of Qahtan, grandson of the Islamic prophet Hud, and ancestor of the Himyarite, Qataban and Sabaean kingdoms. Ya'rub (or, by alternate accounts, Ya'rub's son), is sometimes credited with the invention of the Arabic language.

During ancient times, the ʿĀd Kingdom was a transshipment point for the frankincense trade. It was exported mostly to ancient Europe. It has been suggested the ʿĀd Kingdom, and the current location of Mahra Sultanate, were the first places in the world where the camel was domesticated.

=== Islamic period ===
During the first decade of the Islamic calendar (the 620s in the Gregorian calendar), a large delegation from Mahra under the leadership of Mehri bin Abyad went to Medina to meet the Islamic prophet Muhammad, and during that meeting the entire Mehri tribe decided to embrace Islam. Before embracing Islam, the tribe was polytheist and worshiped multiple deities. After the meeting in Medina, Muhammad issued an injunction, stating that the members of the Mehri tribe are true Muslims and no war should be waged against them, and that any violator of the injunction shall be considered to be waging war against Allah.

The entire Mehri tribe became some of the earliest adopters of Islam. Their action had an added bonus as becoming Muslims secured them a political alliance and stable relations with the Muslim leadership in Medina. Prior to embracing Islam, Al-Mahra was a vassal state of the Achaemenid Empire and had been subjected to Persian control for many years. Siding with Medina enabled the Mehri people to break away from Persian control and regain their liberty.

==== Ridda Wars ====
When Muhammad died in the year 632 CE, many Arab tribes, including the Mehri, interpreted his death as the end of Islam, and they abandoned the religion by either reverting to paganism or following certain individuals who claimed prophethood. In 634 CE, the Mehri and other tribes rebelled against Caliph Abu Bakar who became the new leader of the Muslims. In response, he launched a new military campaign against the rebels.

There were not many records about the power structure within the Mehris, however, during the Ridda Wars information regarding the intra-tribal affair was revealed by al-Tabari. According to al-Tabari, before the death of Muhammad, there was an intra-tribal rivalry within the Mehri tribe, which consisted of two competing factions: the Bani Shakhrah faction and their larger rival, the Bani Muharib. The Bani Muharib, who hailed from Al-Mahra's mountain regions, had the upper hand against their smaller rival.

A Muslim army under the command of Ikrimah ibn Abi Jahl was sent to Al-Mahra to face the Mehri who had turned their back on Islam like many Arab tribes. The Muslim army was too weak to confront the Mehri tribe in battle, and this situation forced Ikrimah to engage in political activity rather than initiating war in Mahra. Ikrimah met with the leadership of the Bani Muharib faction and convinced them to return to Islam. After this event, the army under Ikrimah's command, and the Bani Muharib faction, formed a military alliance against the Bani Shakhrah. The Ridda War in Al-Mahra ended quickly as the newly formed alliance subdued the Bani Shakhrah faction without bloodshed. Islam was once again the only religion in Al-Mahra.

==== The military legacy of al-Mahra ====
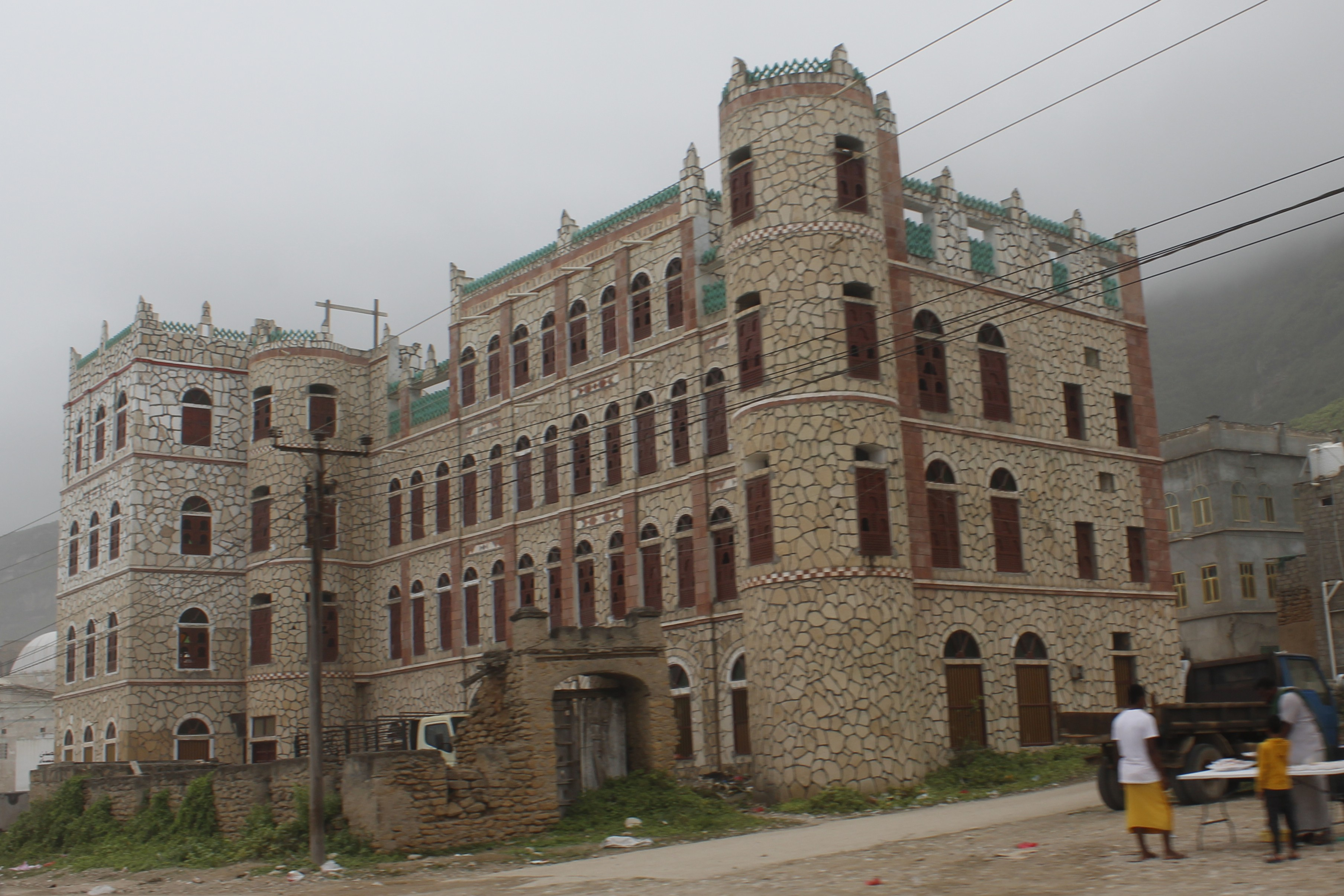
Bin Yasir Fort in the Hawf District

The people of al-Mahra played a role in the history of Islam and the Arab world's military achievements during the early years of Islam. The Mehri army participated in the first Muslim conquest of the Maghreb. The Mehri tribe's achievements have been well-documented by historian Ibn 'Abd al-Hakam in his book titled The History of the Conquests of Egypt and North Africa and Spain.

At the beginning of the first Muslim conquest of the Maghreb, the Al-Mahri tribe mostly contributed cavalry to the army. They played a crucial role in the Arab army under the command of 'Amr ibn al-'As, who was a well-known Arab military commander and one of the Sahaba Companions. The Al-Mahri army fought alongside him during the Arab conquest of North Africa, which began with the defeat of the Byzantine imperial forces at the Battle of Heliopolis, and later at the Battle of Nikiou in Egypt in the year 646. The Mehri army were highly skilled cavalry which rode horses and a special camel breed called the Mehri originating from Al-Mahra which was renowned for its speed, agility and toughness. The Al-Mahra contingent even spearheaded the army during the conquest of the city of Alexandria.

The Al-Mahra army was nicknamed "the people who kill without being killed" by 'Amr ibn al-'As. Commander 'Amr ibn al-'As was amazed by Mehri army's ruthlessly fighting skill and efficient warfare.

As a result of Al-Mahri's success in the Muslim conquest of Egypt, its commander named Abd al-sallam ibn Habira al-Mahri was promoted and he was ordered by 'Amr ibn al-'As to lead the entire Muslim army during the Arab conquest of Libya which at the time was a Byzantine territory. The army under the command Abd al-sallam ibn Habira Al-Mahri defeated the Byzantine imperial army in Libya, and this campaign headed by Commander Al-Mahri brought a permanent end to Byzantine rule of Libya. After the Muslim conquest of Egypt, Abd al-sallam ibn Habira Al-Mahri was once again promoted as a result of his success as a temporary commander of the entire Muslim army, and subsequently he was appointed the first Muslim leader of Libya.

During the Second Fitna, more than 600 soldiers carrying the Al-Mahra flag were sent to North Africa to fight the Byzantines and Berbers.

Throughout the first Muslim conquest of the Maghreb the army from Al-Mahra were awarded lands in the newly conquered territories. Initially the Mehri tribe were awarded lands in the region of Jabal Yashkar by the Muslim leadership. This region was located east of the town of Al-Askar which at that time was the capital of Egypt. After the end of Muslim conquest of Egypt in year 641, the Muslim commander 'Amr ibn al-'As established the town of Fustat which became the new capital of Egypt, and the Mehri tribe were given additional land in Fustat which then became known as Khittat Mahra or the Mahra quarter in English. This land was used by the Mahra forces as a garrison. The Mahra quarter was named after the residents from Al-Mahra as they were the sole residents and owners of the land. Other Arab tribes which were part of the Muslim conquest of Egypt had to share lands which is the reason why their lands bore a non-tribal name. The Mahra tribe also shared the al-Raya quarter in Fustat with various tribes who were closely associated with the Muhammad and, according to historical accounts, the Mahra forces used the al-Raya quarter as a residence and stable for their precious horses. The Mahra quarter was located close to the Al-Raya quarter was which the absolute centre of the new capital of Fustat. Later, the Mahra neighbourhood was renamed and lost its historic name.

Several centuries later, another Mehri man called Abu Bekr Mohammed Ibn Ammar Al-Mahri Ash-shilbi, who was a politician from modern-day Silves, Portugal, became a prime minister of the Taifa of Seville in Islamic Iberia, and served King Al-Mu'tamid ibn Abbad, who was member of Muslim dynasties of Spain. Abu Bekr was highly competent as prime minister, but later he crowned himself king of the annexed Taifa of Murcia and led a failed rebellion against the Mohammedan dynasties of Spain. In year 1084, Abu Bekr Mohammed Ibn Ammar Al-Mahri Ash-shilbi was caught and executed by the forces of the Kingdom of Seville.

=== Yemeni Civil War ===
The governorate has remained relatively untouched by the civil war in Yemen that began in 2015.

On 10 September 2016, three militants in al-Mahrah Governorate declared on social media the formation of a new wilayat, or state, belonging to the Islamic State of Iraq and the Levant (ISIL). However, official ISIL media did not acknowledge the declaration.

From 2015 to late 2017, al-Mahrah was under the control of the Yemeni 123rd and 137th Mechanized Brigades. From mid-November 2017 onwards, Saudi Arabia began increasing its presence in the governorate, taking control of facilities, Nishtun port, the Sarfit and Shehen border crossings, and al-Gaydah Airport, while establishing military outposts around key infrastructure and coastal areas. On 27 November 2017, Mohammed Abdullah Kuddah, the governor of al-Mahrah, was replaced by Rajeh Said Bakrit, following the former's objections to Saudi influence.

== Demographics ==
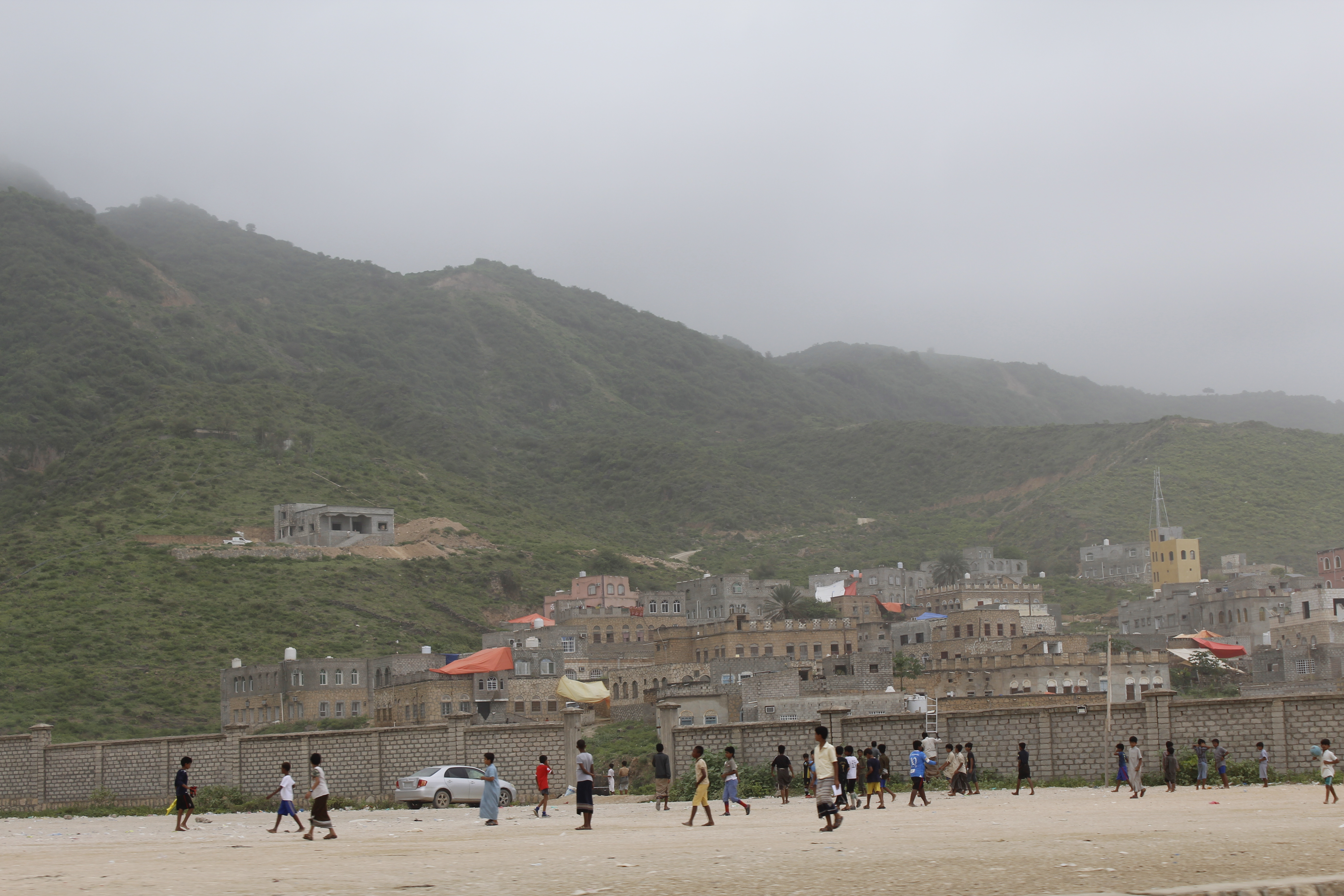
Children playing in the town of al-Hawf in the Hawf District

A sizeable part of the Mahrah population does not speak Arabic as their primary language. Non-Arabic speakers primarily speak Mehri, a modern South Arabian language. The people that speak Mahri call themselves 'Mahris', and are presumed to be descendants of the ancient people of 'Ad.

=== Population ===
Al Mahrah is the least populated governorate in the Republic of Yemen, accounting for approximately 0.5% of the total national population. According to the 2004 General Census of Population, Housing, and Establishments, the total population was 88,594 people, with an annual growth rate of 4.51%.

The population is primarily concentrated in the southern coastal plain, which contains most of the major urban centers, including the provincial capital, Al Ghaydah. This concentration is due to the region's economic reliance on fishing and trade. In contrast, the northern districts bordering the Rub' al Khali desert, such as Hat and Shahan, are extremely sparsely populated.

Population, housing units, households, and area of Al Mahrah Governorate (2004 Census)
No.	District	Area (km²)	Density (pop/km²)	Housing units	Households	Males	Females	Total
1	Shahan	8778	0.3591	550	540	1879	1273	3152
2	Hat	19303	0.144	435	432	1525	1261	2786
3	Hawf	1531	3.359	932	925	2786	2357	5143
4	Al Ghaydah	7159	3.828	3648	3833	15399	11992	27404
5	Man'ar	17279	0.312	766	783	2873	2507	5388
6	Al Masilah	6806	1.529	1642	1585	5146	5258	10404
7	Sayhut	2667	4.404	1753	1653	6153	5593	11746
8	Qishn	3485	3.283	1737	2097	6291	5150	11441
9	Huswain	1843	6.039	1399	2085	6042	5088	11130
Total		68851	1.287	12862	13933	48110	40484	88594

== Geography ==
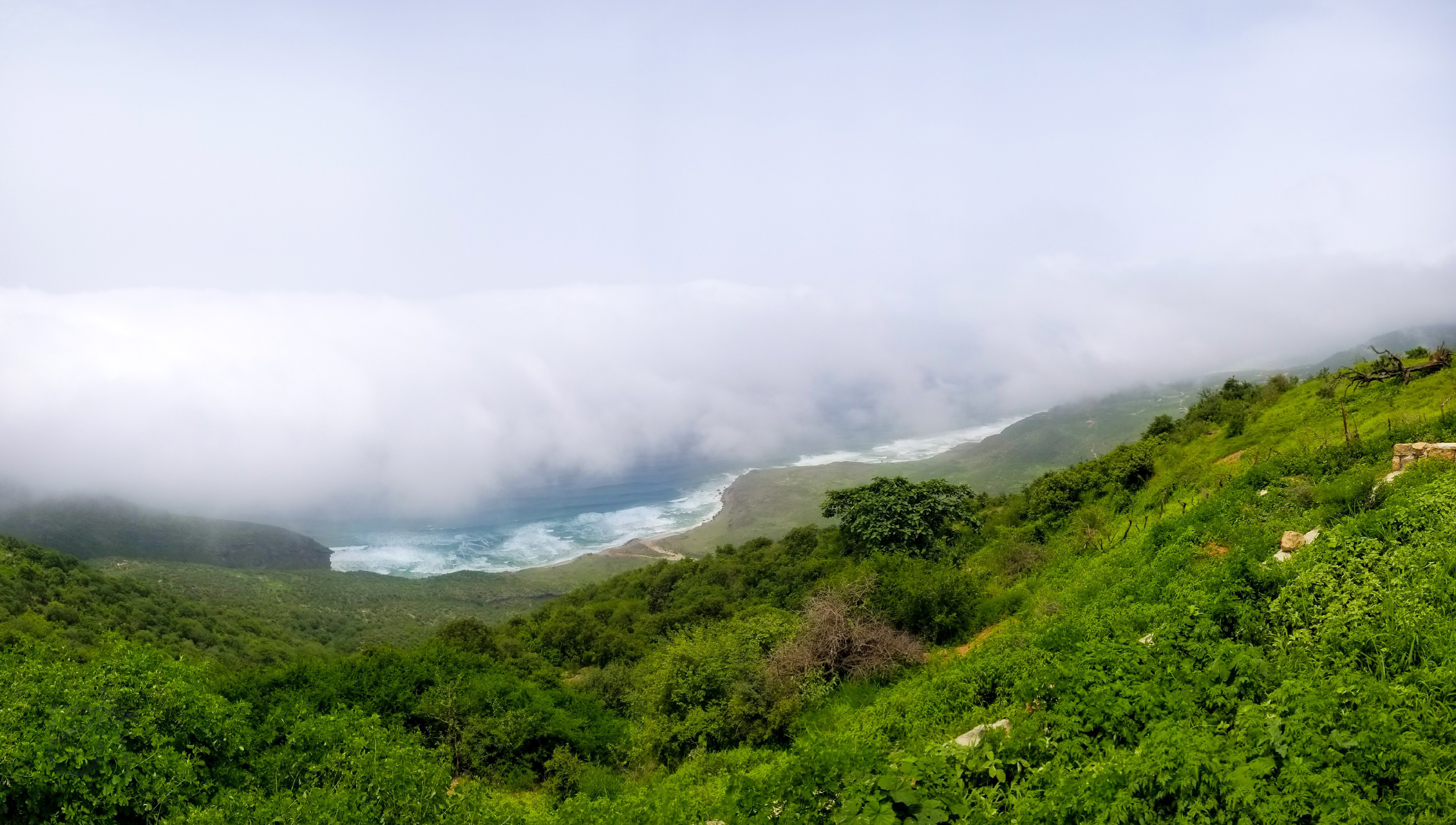
The Hawf district in Al Mahrah during the annual Khareef season.

Al Mahrah is situated in the easternmost part of Yemen, approximately 1,318 kilometres (819 mi) from Sana'a, and is often referred to as the country's eastern gateway. It covers an area of roughly 67,297 square kilometres (25,984 sq mi), bordering the Rub' al Khali to the north, the Sultanate of Oman to the east, and Hadramaut Governorate to the west.

The topography is characterized by three primary regions: a southern coastal plain, a central mountain plateau, and the northern desert. The coastal plain stretches for about 500 kilometres (310 mi) along the Arabian Sea, with the specific segment from the Hadramaut border to the Omani border extending 375 kilometres (233 mi). This plain rises to a maximum elevation of approximately 250 metres (820 ft) and is where the majority of the population and urban centers are located. Moving inland, the central plateau consists of rugged mountain ranges and valleys, including peaks such as Jabal al-Habshiya, Jabal al-Ghart, and the Jabal Bani Kashit range. These mountains, sometimes referred to as the Mahrat or part of the broader Hadhramaut Mountains, reach heights of around 1,300 metres (4,300 ft). Other notable geological features in the governorate include the Well of Barhout sinkhole and the lush valleys of the Hawf region.

The climate is generally hot during the summer and moderate in the winter, though it is significantly influenced by the seasonal monsoon, known as the Khareef. During this period, the coastal mountains near the border with Oman become enveloped in fog and moisture, transforming the typically barren landscape into verdant forests and valleys. While water scarcity is common across the governorate, rainfall is primarily concentrated in the summer and winter months within these mountainous areas, with annual precipitation recorded at 982 millimetres (38.7 in) in 2004.

The biological diversity of the region is shaped by its arid and semi-arid environments. Vegetation predominantly consists of desert shrubs and herbs that appear following rainfall, alongside perennial trees such as the frankincense tree (Boswellia sacra), sidr, and various acacia species like the samar. The remote valleys and mountains provide a habitat for wildlife including foxes, rabbits, and hedgehogs, as well as rarer species such as the Arabian leopard and gazelles. The avian population is equally diverse, featuring birds of prey like falcons and owls alongside various smaller species found in the more densely vegetated wadis.

=== Adjacent governorates ===
Governorates of Yemen

- Hadhramaut Governorate (west)
- Dhofar Governorate, Oman (east)

== See also ==
- The Hadhramaut Governorate – nearby
