= Mahris =

Yemeni ethnographic group in southern Arabia

Mahri
المهريون
- Flag used by Mehri people; It used to be the flag of the Mahra Sultanate

- Map of Yemen showing Al Mahrah Governorate.

Regions with significant populations
- Yemen; Oman; Disapora regions: Kuwait; Somalia; Saudi Arabia

Languages
- Mehri, Arabic

Religion
- Islam

Related ethnic groups
- Other Semitic-speaking peoples Especially Harasis, Soqotri, and other Modern South Arabian-speaking peoples

The Mahris (Arabic: المهريون), also known as the al-Mahra tribe (Arabic: قبيلة المهرة), are a Yemeni ethnographic group primarily inhabiting South Arabia especially in the Al-Mahra Governorate in Yemen and the island of Socotra in the Guardafui Channel. They are named after Mahra bin Haydan. They can also be found in the Sultanate of Oman, and the eastern region of the Arabian Peninsula.

They have participated in the conquests of North Africa, Morocco and Andalusia, and they lived there. Some of them work in fishing, and some of them live in the desert, and it is to them that the Mahri camels are attributed in the Arab heritage. The Mahra were famous for their Mahri language, which is a Semitic language belonging to the eastern family within the group of South Semitic languages, and it is a language closely related to other neighboring languages, such as the Shehri and Socotri languages. They have an ancient history, and they were mentioned in a number of Sabaean writings in Al-Musnad script, and had a sultanate that lasted for five centuries which remained in existence until 1967, which was the Mahra Sultanate.

== Origin ==
Mahras are descended from Mahra ibn Haydan ibn Amr ibn al-Hafi Quda'a ibn Malik ibn Amr ibn Murra ibn Zayd ibn Malik ibn Ḥimyar, who was from Quda'a.

== Distribution ==
The Mahri are one of the largest tribes in the Al Mahrah Governorate of Yemen and in the island of Socotra and Dhofar Governorate of Oman. Mehri group members are also found in other countries in the Arabian Peninsula like Kuwait, Saudi Arabia and the UAE.

The Mahri also have a significant presence in the northern Puntland state in Somalia since they had historical ties and close proximity to the Horn of Africa for centuries. They also participated in the Ethiopian–Adal War in the 16th century on the side of Ahmad ibn Ibrahim al-Ghazi. The Socotra Archipelago to the nearest point on the African mainland Cape Guardafui is 232 km.

According to Ethnologue, there are around 115,200 total Mahri speakers. Of those, 50,000 live in Yemen (2011), 50,800 in Oman (2000), and 14,400 in Kuwait (2000), and according to Saudi officials there are around 20,000 Mehri speakers in Saudi Arabia.

== Language ==
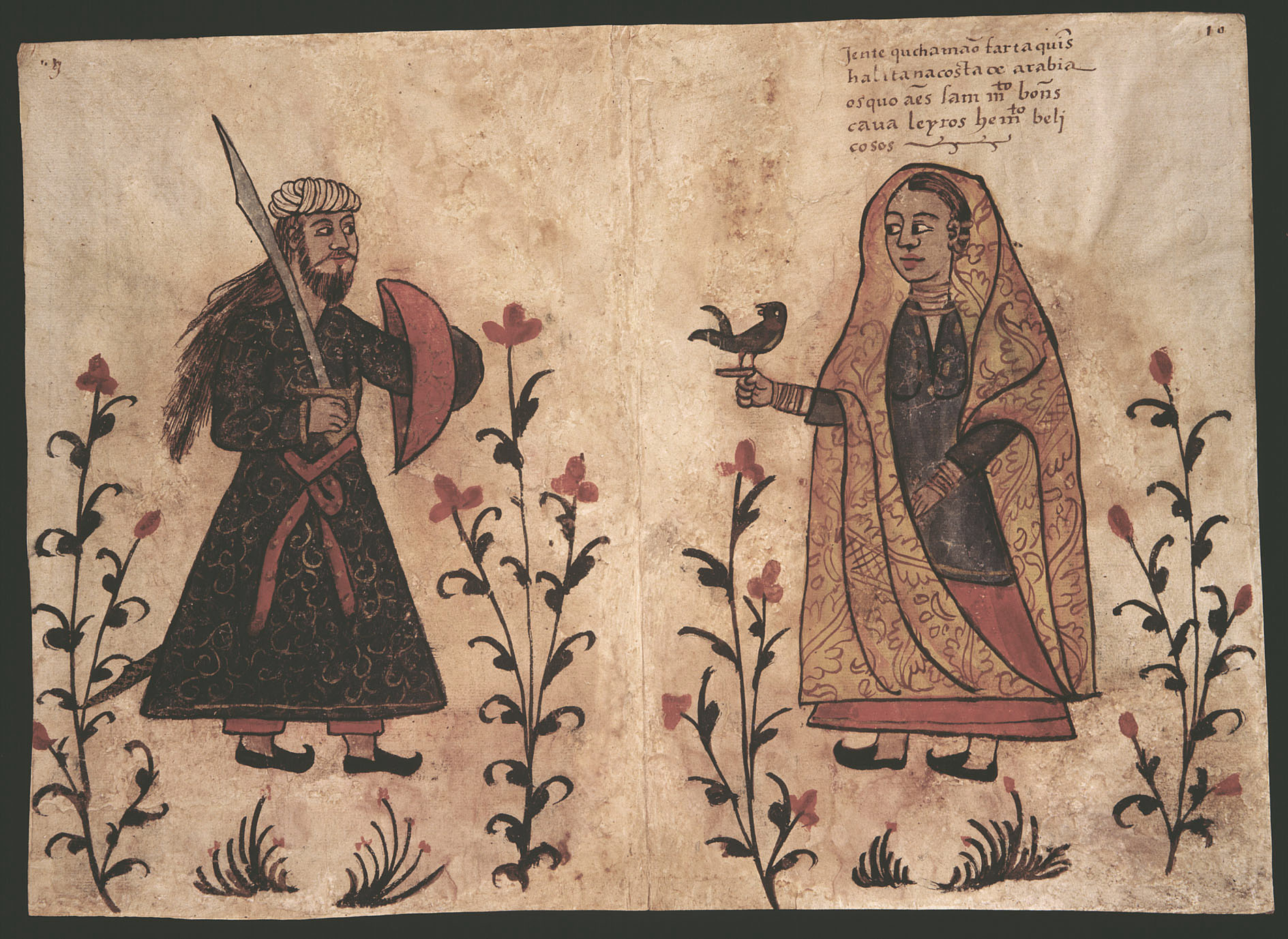
Depiction of Mahri people from the 16th-century Códice Casanatense, labeled as Fartaques, in reference to the Cape Fartak.

The Mahri speak the Mehri language as their native tongue. It belongs to the Modern South Arabian (MSA) subgroup of the Afroasiatic family's Semitic branch.

Mahri is divided into two main dialects: Eastern Mahri (Mehriyot) and Western Mahri (Mehriyet). These idioms in turn have urban and Bedouin varieties.

On the island of Socotra, the Mahri inhabitants speak the native Soqotri language of the Soqotri people.

The Mahri language is most closely related to other Modern South Arabian languages, such as Bathari and Soqotri. These tongues collectively share many features with the Old South Arabian languages (Epigraphic South Arabian), as spoken by the ancient Sabaeans, Minaeans, and Qatabanians.

== Religion ==
The Mahri are predominantly Muslims. A delegation from al-Mahra led by Mahri bin Al-Abid visited the Prophet of Allah, Muhammad, who presented Islam to them, and they embraced the faith. The Prophet wrote a letter for them, which read: "This is a letter from Muhammad, the Messenger of Allah, to Mahri bin Al-Abyad and those who believe among the Mahri. They shall not be harmed or subjected to any wrongdoing. They are to abide by the laws of Islam. Whoever changes his stance and opposes shall be fought against, while whoever believes and adheres to it shall have the protection of Allah and His Messenger".

According to historical accounts, Mahri bin Qurdam, son of Al-Ajil from Ashhar, visited Muhammad, who honored and respected him despite the distance he had traveled. When Mahri bin Qurdam intended to leave, Muhammad supported and carried him and wrote a letter for him, which remains with them to this day.

=== Islamic Conquests ===
During the early years of Islam, the Mahri tribe played a significant role in the history of Islam and the military achievements of the Arab world. They participated in the conquest of North Africa and Spain. Their exploits were documented by the historian Ibn Abd Al-Hakam in his book titled "Futuh Misr wa Akhbaruha" (The Conquest of Egypt and Its News). The Mahri tribe played a crucial role in the Arab Muslim army under the leadership of Amr ibn al-As, a renowned military commander and one of Muhammad's companions. They fought alongside him during the Islamic conquest of North Africa, starting with the defeat of the Byzantine forces in the Battle of Heliopolis, followed by the Battle of Nikiou in Egypt in 646.

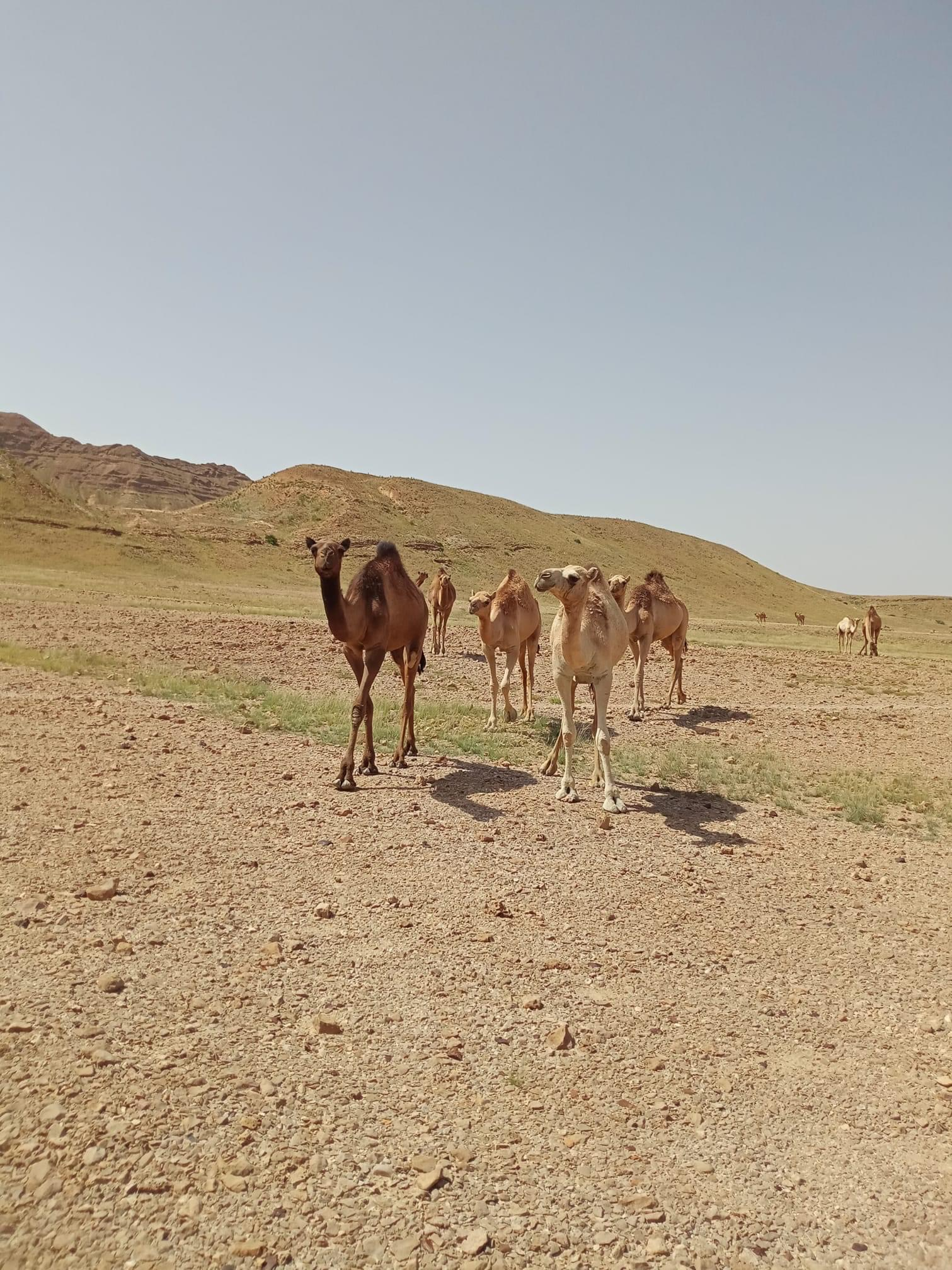
Mahri camels in Al Mahra

Throughout the Islamic conquest of North Africa, the Mahri army was granted lands in the newly occupied territories. Initially, they were given the area of Jabal Yashkur by the Islamic leadership. This region is located east of the city of Al-Askar. After the end of the Islamic conquest of Egypt in 641, the Muslim commander Amr ibn al-As founded the city of Fustat, which became the new capital of Egypt. The army was given additional land in the new capital, which later became known as Hayy Al-Mehri in Arabic, or the Mahri Quarter in English. This land was used by the Mahri forces as their headquarters. The Mahri tribe was named after this area because they were the sole landowners. Other Arab tribes that were part of the Islamic conquest of Egypt shared the lands, which is why their lands bear names not associated with tribes. The Mahri tribe also participated in Hayy Al-Raya in Fustat, along with other tribes closely linked to Muhammad. According to historical accounts, the Mahri forces used Hayy Al-Raya as a base and stable for their horses. Hayy Al-Mehri is located near Hayy Al-Raya, which was the absolute center of the new capital, Fustat.

== Mahri camels ==
The Mahri region is known for its purebred Mahri camels, which were an integral part of the military success of the Mahri army during the Islamic conquests of Egypt and North Africa against the Byzantine Empire. The Mahri cavalry unit introduced the Mahri camels to North Africa during the conquests, and they are now found throughout the region. They are sometimes referred to as the Coastal Camels. These camels are famous for their speed, agility, and endurance. They have a large but slender build, and their small hump is a characteristic feature. Since ancient times, various camel breeds, including the Adiya breed, were known in the Mahri region. Among these breeds was the Eid camel, known for its speed and high milk production, which became a symbol of swiftness. This breed continues to exist in the eastern and western valleys of Al-Mahra region.

== Genetics ==
According to Y-DNA analysis by Černý et al. (2009), most inhabitants of Socotra, some of whom are Mahri descendants, belong to the basal haplogroup J. Around 71.4% of them carry J*(xJ1,J2), which is the highest reported frequency of the paternal clade.

Maternally, basal haplogroup N likewise occurs at its highest frequencies on the island (24.3%). Mitochondrial analysis by Non (2010) found that the haplogroup R0a (27.7%) is the most common mtDNA clade among the Mahri within the Mahra Governorate. The next most frequent maternal lineages borne by the Mahri are the haplogroups H (13.9%), R2 (13.9%), L2a1 (4.6%), and K (1.5%), as well as various subclades of the macro-haplogroup L(xM,N) (21.5%).

According to a study from 2017 that sampled southern Arabians, the Mahra were stated to be minimally or non-admixed as they had >85.9% Arabian ancestry proportions.

== See also ==
- Mahra Sultanate
- Hadarem
- Socotri
- Socotra
