= Yemenis =

Nationals of Yemen

Arabic: يمنيون
- Map of the Yemeni people around the world Yemen + 1,000,000 + 100,000 + 10,000 + 1,000

Total population
- Yemen : 31,461,438; Yemeni diaspora : 7,000,000; Total : 38,461,438

Regions with significant populations
- Saudi Arabia: 1,803,469
- Egypt: 1,000,000
- India: 300,000 (incl. ancestry)
- United States: 91,288
- United Arab Emirates: 90,000
- United Kingdom: 70,000-80,000
- Eritrea: 71,000
- Madagascar: 61,000
- Israel: 50,000 (Number of Yemenite Jews that migrated to Israel)
- Ethiopia: 37,500
- Jordan: 32,000
- Turkey: 30,000
- Malaysia: 20,000
- Somalia: 13,134
- Canada: 8,115
- Djibouti: 8,064 (estimated)
- Pakistan: 5,000
- Sweden: 3,785
- Netherlands: 3,777
- Oman: 2,500

Languages
- Arabic: varieties of Yemeni Arabic (majority) · Standard Arabic (official) · Mehri · Socotri · Hobyot · Razihi · Judeo-Yemeni (historically)

Religion
- Predominantly Islam · significant minorities of Judaism

Related ethnic groups
- Other Arabs

Yemenis or Yemenites (Arabic: يمنيون) are an Arab ethnic group native to Yemen. The majority speak varieties of Yemeni Arabic, while several Modern South Arabian languages, including Mehri, Socotri and Hobyot, are also spoken.

Yemeni society has historically included strong tribal and regional identities, with tribes continuing to play an important social role. Yemenis are predominantly Muslims, while Yemen historically also had a significant Jewish community.

A substantial Yemeni diaspora exists outside Yemen, particularly in other parts of the Arabian Peninsula, as well as in Africa, Asia, Europe and North America. The Yemeni civil war has resulted in displacement within Yemen and migration to neighboring countries, including countries in the Horn of Africa.

== Social hierarchy ==
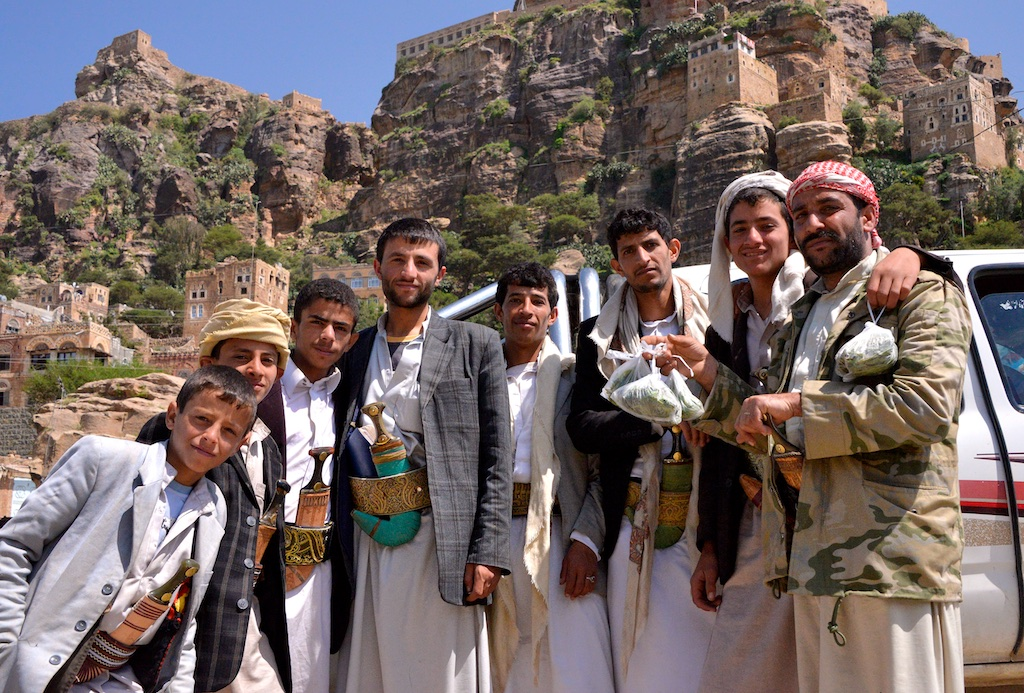
Yemeni tribesmen

Yemen is notable as the most tribal nation in the Arab world, largely due to the significant influence of tribal leaders and their deep integration into various aspects of the state. Estimates vary, with approximately 200 tribes in Yemen, although some reports list more than 400.

There is a system of social stratification in Yemen that was officially abolished at the creation of the Republic of Yemen in 1962. In practice this system has not disappeared, and Yemeni society is still organized around social hierarchies. The difference between social ranks is manifested by descent and occupation and is consolidated by marriages between people of the same ranks.

There are five status groups. At the top of the hierarchy, there are the religious elites, also called sada. These are then followed by the strata of judges (quad). The third hierarchical status is the qaba’il, who are the peasants, who belong to tribes and who live mainly from agriculture and trading. The fourth group is called the mazayanah. This group is composed of people who have no land and provide different kinds of services such as butchers and craftsmen. Finally, at the bottom of the hierarchy are the slaves (a’bid) and even further below them Al-Akhdam, which means servants.

== Diaspora ==
The Yemeni diaspora is largely concentrated in the United Kingdom, where between 70,000 and 80,000 Yemenis live. Over 20,000 Yemenis reside in the United States, and an additional 2,800 live in Italy. Yemenis also reside in Saudi Arabia, the United Arab Emirates, Qatar, and Bahrain, as well as India, Indonesia, Malaysia, Brunei, Madagascar, and the former USSR. A smaller number of modern-day Pakistanis are of Yemeni descent, their original ancestors having left Yemen for the Indian subcontinent and Southeast Asia over four centuries ago. Arab Indonesians are Indonesian citizens of Arab or mixed Arab-Indonesian descent, mainly Hadharem from Yemen. The census of 2005 recorded a total of 87,227 Arab Indonesians. Around 50,000 Yemenite Jews migrated to the State of Israel.

Following the outbreak of the Yemeni civil war in 2015, Yemenis fled across the Red Sea to countries in the Horn of Africa, including Djibouti and Somalia. Renewed conflict in Yemen in September 2026 caused another wave of displacement across the Bab-el-Mandeb. By the morning of 17 September, the United Nations High Commissioner for Refugees (UNHCR) estimated that 2,935 people had arrived in Djibouti from Yemen over eight consecutive days.

== Notable Yemenis ==
- Abu Bakr Salem, Yemeni singer
- Amna Al-Nasiri, Yemeni plastic artist, art critic, writer
- Bakar, English singer
- Tawakkol Karman, Yemeni Nobel Laureate, journalist, politician, and human rights activist
- Anwar al-Awlaki, Yemeni-American imam
- Hind Al-Eryani, Yemeni activist and journalist
- Ali al-Jifri, Yemeni Islamic scholar
- Shoshana Damari, Yemenite Jewish-Israeli singer
- Shatha Altowai, visual artist
- Saber Bamatraf, Yemeni pianist, composer and cultural activist
- Arwa Othman, Yemeni writer, journalist, human rights activist and former Minister of Culture
- Balqees, Yemeni singer
- Saadaldeen Talib, politician
- Abu Musa al-Ash'ari, companion of the Prophet Muhammed
