= Janet Watson (linguist) =

English linguist and phonologist

Janet Constance Elizabeth Watson (born 1959) is a linguist and phonologist. She is Professor in the School of Languages, Cultures, and Societies at the University of Leeds. Her main research interests are the documentation and analysis of Modern South Arabian languages and modern Arabic dialects spoken within the south-western Arabian Peninsula.

== Biography ==
Watson studied Arabic and Islamic Studies at the University of Exeter before earning her PhD in Linguistics in 1989 at the SOAS University of Londonwith a thesis entitled Aspects of the phonology and verb morphology of three Yemeni dialects.

Since 2006, she has been documenting dialects of Mehri, one of six endangered Modern South Arabian languages spoken in the far south of the Arabian Peninsula. Since January 2013, she has been leading an international team to document the five Modern South Arabian languages spoken in mainland Yemen and Oman. This research has been supported by prestigious grants: a Leverhulme Trust Research Fellowship (2007-08), a British Academy/Leverhulme Trust Senior Research Fellowship (2010-11), and a Leverhulme Trust Project Grant (2013-2016). Between 2010 and 2012, she collaborated with colleagues on a project investigating the geographical distribution, phonetics, and phonology of lateral emphatics in Saudi Arabian Arabic dialects that was funded by the King Faisal Centre for Research and Islamic Studies in Saudi Arabia.

== Honors and distinctions ==
Watson is on the steering committee and editorial board for the Seminar of Arabian Studies, the editorial board of the Journal of Semitic Studies, and the advisory board of the Zeitschrift für Arabische Linguistik.

She was elected as a fellow of the British Academy in 2013.

== Selected publications ==
Books:

Watson, J. C. E., & Mutahhar, A. R. (2002). Social Issues in Popular Yemeni Culture. al-Sabahi.

Dickins, J., & Watson, J. C. E. (1999a). Standard Arabic: An advanced course. Cambridge University Press.

Dickins, J., & Watson, J. C. E. (1999b). Standard Arabic: Teacher's handbook and key to the exercises. Cambridge University Press.

Watson, J. C. E. (2012). The Structure of Mehri. Harrassowitz.

Watson, J. C. E. (2002). Phonology and Morphology of Arabic. Oxford University Press.

Journal Articles:

Watson, J. C. E., Eades, D., & Al-Mahri, M. (in press). Camel culture and camel terminology amongst the Omani Bedouin. Journal of Semitic Studies.

Watson, J. C. E., & Bellem, A. (2011). Glottalisation and neutralisation in Yemeni Arabic and Mehri: An acoustic study. In B. Heselwood & Z. Hassan (Eds.), Arabic Instrumental Phonetics (pp. 235–256). Amsterdam: Benjamins.

Watson, J. C. E., & Rowlett, P. (2012). Jespersen’s cycle and negation in Mehri. In D. Eades (Ed.), Grammaticalisation in Semitic (pp. 205–225). Oxford University Press.
