= Emphatic consonant =

Series of obstruent consonants in Semitic languages

In Semitic linguistics, an emphatic consonant is an obstruent consonant which originally contrasted, and often still contrasts, with an analogous voiced or voiceless obstruent by means of a secondary articulation. In specific Semitic languages, the members of the emphatic series may be realized as uvularized, pharyngealized, velarized or ejective, or by plain voicing contrast; for instance, in Arabic, emphasis involves retraction of the dorsum (or root) of the tongue, which has variously been described as velarization or pharyngealization depending on where the locus of the retraction is assumed to be. The term is also used, to a lesser extent, to describe cognate series in other Afro-Asiatic languages, where they are typically realized as ejective, implosive or pharyngealized consonants.

In Semitic studies, emphatic consonants are commonly transcribed using the convention of placing a dot under the closest plain consonant in the Latin alphabet. However, exceptions exist: original emphatic k developed into /q/ in most Semitic languages; strictly speaking, it has thus ceased to be an emphatic version of k and has become a different consonant, being most commonly transcribed as q (rather than ḳ) accordingly.

Within Arabic, the four emphatic consonants vary in phonetic realization from dialect to dialect, but are typically realized as pharyngealized consonants. In Ethiopian Semitic and Modern South Arabian languages, they are realized as ejective consonants. While these sounds do not necessarily share any particular phonetic properties in common, most historically derive from a common source.

Five such "emphatic" phonemes are reconstructed for Proto-Semitic:

Proto-Semitic			Modern South Arabian	Standard Arabic		Modern Hebrew		Aramaic	
Phoneme description	IPA	Trans.	IPA	Letter	IPA	Letter	IPA	Letter	IPA
Alveolar ejective	[tʼ]	ṭ	[tʼ]	Ṭāʼ ط	[tˤ]	Tet ט	[t]	Teth ט	[tˤ]
Dental ejective fricative	[θʼ]	ṯ̣	[θʼ]	Ẓāʾ ظ	[ðˤ]	Tsadi צ	[t͡s]	Teth ט	[tˤ]
Alveolar ejective fricative or affricate	[tsʼ]/[sʼ]	ṣ	[sʼ]	Ṣād ص	[sˤ]	Tsadi צ	[t͡s]	Ṣade צ	[sˤ]
Alveolar lateral ejective fricative or affricate	[ɬʼ]/[tɬʼ]	ṣ́	[ɬʼ]	Ḍād ض	[dˤ] (Note: Historically, the emphatic consonant /dˤ/ was pronounced [ɮˤ], or possibly [d͡ɮˤ]—either way, a highly unusual sound. The medieval Arabs even termed their language لغة الضاد lughat al-ḍād 'the language of the Ḍād' (the name of the letter used for this sound), believing the sound unique to their language, though it also occurs in Mehri. It is preserved among older speakers in a few isolated dialects.)	Tsadi צ	[t͡s]	Ayin ע	[ʕ]
Velar ejective	[kʼ]	ḳ	[kʼ]	Qāf ق	[q] (Note: This consonant is not considered emphatic in Arabic, and it is pronounced as a [ɡ] or [ʔ] or [q] in most Arabic dialects, the latter ([q]) is also considered the standard pronunciation in both Standard and Classical Arabic registers.)	Qof ק	[k]	Qoph ק	[q]

An additional emphatic phoneme /ʃʼ/ (/çʼ/ in Central Jibbali) occurs in all the Modern South Arabian languages. There are few occurrences of it and the phoneme never appears in the same words in the six MSAL (Mehri, Soqotri, Shehri (Jibbali), Harsusi, Hobyot, and Bathari), in a few occurrences, no phonological explanation can be given to its occurrence, but it appears to be connected to different phonological developments:

1. From Proto-Semitic ṣ [sʼ]: Mehri /ʃʼəbaːʔ/, /haʃʼbaːʔ/ or /ħaʃʼ.baːʕ/, Hobyot from Hedemet /hiːʃʼəbaːʔ/, Harsusi /haʃʼbaːʔ/ vs. Jibbali /ʔisʼ.baːʕ/, Hobyot from Hawf /ʔiːsʼəbaːʕ/, Soqotri /ʔəsʼ.baʕ/ and Arabic /ʔisˤ.baʕ/; meaning 'finger'.
2. From Proto-Semitic ṣ́ [ɬʼ]: Mehri /ʃʼəf.deːt/, Harsusi /ʃʼəf.daːjt/ vs. Arabic /dˤif.daʕ/; meaning 'frog'.
3. From Proto-Semitic ḳ [kʼ]: Jibbali /ʃʼujeːt/ vs. Mehri /kʼaːjmət/ and Arabic /qijaːma/; meaning ‘judgment day’.

An extra emphatic labial *ṗ occurs in some Semitic languages, but it is unclear whether it was a phoneme in Proto-Semitic.

- The classical Ethiopian Semitic language Geʽez is unique among Semitic languages for contrasting all three of /p/, /f/, and /pʼ/. While /p/ and /pʼ/ occur mostly in loanwords (especially from Greek), there are many other occurrences whose origin is less clear (such as hepʼä 'strike', häppälä 'wash clothes').
- As has been known at least since 1870, Hebrew developed, when borrowing one particular word from Old Persian, an emphatic labial phoneme ṗ to represent unaspirated /p/ from Persian and Greek; this phoneme is not attested in Hebrew orthography.

General Modern Israeli Hebrew and Maltese are notable exceptions among Semitic languages to the presence of emphatic consonants. In both languages, they have been lost under the influence of Indo-European languages (chiefly Yiddish and Sicilian, respectively, though other languages may also have had an influence; see revival of the Hebrew language).

- In Hebrew, the letter tsadi (from Proto-Semitic ṯ̣, ṣ, ṣ́) remains distinct, but has been replaced by a non-pharygealized affricate /ts/. Emphatic ḳ has been merged with plain k in non-lenited positions, but remains distinct post-vocally, where the plain consonant becomes /x/ (phonetically [χ]), while the original emphatic does not. Semitic ṭ has been fully merged with plain t.
- In Maltese, only emphatic ḳ (spelled q) remains distinct. It is still realised as a uvular stop [q] in a few villages but has otherwise developed into a glottal consonant stop [ʔ]. All other emphatics have been merged into plain consonants. However, they are often still recognizable from special vocalic developments that they triggered before the mergers: compare sejf ('sword', from Arabic سَيْف sayf) with sajf ('summer', from Arabic صَيْف ṣayf). The emphatic ṣ prevented the a from being raised to e as it did with the plain s).
