= Mehri language =

Modern South Arabian language

Mehri
- مهريّت, Mahrīyyt
- Native to: Yemen, Oman
- Region: South Arabia
- Ethnicity: Mehri
- Native speakers: 260,000 (2023–2024)
- Language family: Afro-Asiatic: Semitic; West Semitic; South Semitic; Southeast Semitic; Mehri
- Dialects: Mahriyōt (Yemeni Mehri) • Eastern Mehri • Western Mehri; Mehreyyet (Omani Mehri)
- Writing system: Modified version of the Arabic script

Official status
- Regulated by: Mehri Language Centre for Studies and Research

Language codes
- ISO 639-3: gdq
- Glottolog: mehr1241
- ELP: Mehri

- Mehri is classified as "definitely endangered" by the UNESCO Atlas of the World's Languages in Danger

Mehri (endonym: مهريّت, romanized: Mahrīyyt) is a Modern South Arabian language (MSAL) spoken primarily by the Mehri tribes in the Mahra Governorate of Yemen and the Dhofar Governorate of Oman, as well as by smaller diaspora communities in Saudi Arabia, United Arab Emirates, Qatar and Kuwait. It is the most spoken language of the MSAL group, a subgroup of the Semitic branch of the Afroasiatic family. It is one of six distinct languages within the MSAL group, which also includes Shehri, Harsusi, Hobyot, Bathari, and Soqotri.

Mehri and its sister languages were spoken in the southern Arabian Peninsula before the spread of Arabic along with Islam in the 7th century CE. Today it is also spoken by Mehri residents in Arab states of the Persian Gulf originally from Yemen, as well as nationals with a Yemeni heritage. Given the dominance of Arabic in the region over the past 1400 years and the frequent bilingualism with Arabic among Mehri speakers, Mehri is at some risk of extinction. Up to the 19th century, speakers lived as far north as the central part of Oman. It is primarily a spoken language, with little existing vernacular literature and almost no literacy in written Mehri among native speakers.

Mahris consider 2 October to be the Mehri Language Day.

== Dialects ==
Abu Muhammad al-Hasan al-Hamdani noted that "the Mahri speak a barbarous tongue like foreigners". Elsewhere, Hamdani showed extensive knowledge of Arabian dialects, each of which was rated in its distance from classical Arabic.

Today, Mehri exists in two main dialects, Yemeni Mehri (also known as Southern Mehri) and Omani Mehri (also known as Dhofari Mehri and Nagd Mehri). Omani Mehri is spoken by a smaller population and shows no significant variation within itself, but Yemeni Mehri is further divided into western and eastern dialects.

== Phonology ==
Unlike other ESSLs, Mehri 'emphatic' consonants are not simply ejectives. They may also be pharyngealized, as in Arabic, so it is possible for Mehri to attest to a transition from proto-Semitic ejective consonants to the pharyngealized emphatics that are found in many Semitic languages.

The consonant inventory is as follows:

		Labial	Coronal				Velar	Uvular	Pharyngeal	Glottal
		Labial	laminal	lateral	sibilant	palatal	Velar	Uvular	Pharyngeal	Glottal
Nasal		m	n							
Occlusive	voiced	b~pʼ	d			(dʒ~tʃʼ)	ɡ			
Occlusive	voiceless		t				k			ʔ
Occlusive	emphatic		tˁ~tʼ				kʼ			
Continuant	voiced		ð		z		ɣ~ʁ		ʕ	
Continuant	voiceless	f	θ	ɬ̠	s	ʃ	x~χ		ħ	h
Continuant	emphatic		θ̬ˁ~θʼ	ɬ̬ˁ~ɬ̠ʼ	s̬ˁ~sʼ	ʃ̬ˁ~ʃʼ				
Rhotic			r~ɾ							
Semivowel		w		l			j			

- /ɡ/ can be realized as an affricate [dʒ] or palatal plosive [ɟ] in the Yemeni dialect.
- Mahriyōt dialect in Hawf and younger generations of al-Rubūʕah have <ḏ̣> as [ʫ̪ˁ], women speakers of the dialects tend to use an affricate which is sometimes pronounced as voiceless [t͡ʪ].

The vowel inventory is as follows:

	Front	Central	Back
Close	iː		uː
Mid	eː	ə	oː
Mid	ɛ ɛː	ə	
Open		a aː	

Voiced obstruents, or at least voiced stops, devoice in pausa. In this position, both the voiced and emphatic stops are ejective, losing the three-way contrast (/kʼ/ is ejective in all positions). Elsewhere, the emphatic and (optionally) the voiced stops are pharyngealized. Emphatic (but not voiced) fricatives have a similar pattern, and in non-pre-pausal position they are partially voiced.

The difference in place of the laterals is not clear. It may be that the approximant is denti-alveolar, like the alveolar occlusives, and the lateral fricatives apical, or it may be that the latter are palato-alveolar or alveolo-palatal. The fricatives are typically transcribed ś, etc.

/dʒ/ is only in Arabic loans. It is not clear if the rhotic is a trill or a tap.

== Morphology ==
The following are the personal pronouns of Mehri:

		Singular	Dual	Plural
1st person		hōh	kīh	nḥah
2nd person	MASC	hēt	tīh	tām
2nd person	FEM	hīt	tīh	tān
3rd person	MASC	hēh	hīh	hām
3rd person	FEM	sēh	hīh	sān

The following are the possessive suffix versions of those pronouns:

		Singular	Dual	Plural
1st person		-ī	-kī	-(a)n
2nd person	MASC	-(a)k	-kī	-kam
2nd person	FEM	-(a)š	-kī	-kan
3rd person	MASC	-(a)h	-hī	-ham
3rd person	FEM	-(a)s	-hī	-san

The independent pronouns can also be placed after the genitive exponent (ð-) to convert them into possessive pronouns ("mine" etc).

== Writing system ==
Mehri, like other Modern South Arabian languages, possesses a rich oral tradition, but not a written one. There exist two main approaches to writing the language: using the standard Arabic alphabet or using a modified Arabic alphabet that contains additional letters to represent sounds unique to Mehri.

The most common approach is using the unmodified Arabic alphabet. However, standard Arabic’s deficiencies with respect to ESS result in this approach representing multiple phonemes with the same letters. (Note that, in both Arabic and modified Arabic systems, the vowels are not explicitly differentiated, but are differentiated by the readers through context.)

The modified Arabic alphabet has a few systems, none of which are standardized. The most commonly used modified Arabic additional letters as documented in use (e.g., in text messages, email, etc.) by the Modern South Arabian Languages Centre at the University of Leeds; a proposed set of additional letters for the Arabic alphabet to adapt it to be able to be a good systemic for writing ESS languages (including Mehri) by that same centre; and a separate set of additional letters proposed by Almahrah.net for the same purpose are given (along with IPA phonetic transcription and romanizations) in the columns of the table below.

Romanization	IPA	Workaround letters	Leeds proposed letters	Almahrah.net proposed letters
ś	ɬ	ث	پ	ڛ
ṣ̌	ʃˤ	ض	ڞ	
ṯ̣ / ḏ̣	θ̬ˤ~θʼ	ظ	ڟ	
ź	ɬ̬ˤ~ɬ̠ʼ~ʒ	ذ	چ / ڌ	چ
g	ɡ	ج		
ḳ	kʼ	ق		
ē / ɛ̄	ɛ(ː)	ي		ێ

== See also ==
- Soqotri language
- Shehri language
