= South Arabian =

South Arabian may refer to:

- something of, from, or related to the region of South Arabia
- Modern South Arabian, a group of languages presently spoken in Yemen and Oman
- Ancient South Arabian, a mostly extinct group of languages spoken in what is now Yemen
  - Ancient South Arabian script, the writing system of Old South Arabian
