= Soqotri language =

South Semitic language of Socotra, Yemen

Soqoṭri
- ماتڸ دسقطري
- Pronunciation: [ˈmɛtalˠ disaˈk’ɔtˤri]
- Region: Socotra Archipelago, Yemen
- Ethnicity: Soqotri
- Native speakers: 130,000 (2024)
- Language family: Afro-Asiatic: Semitic; West Semitic; South Semitic; Southeast Semitic; Soqoṭri
- Dialects: Eastern Soqotri; Central Soqotri; Western Soqotri
- Writing system: Ad hoc use of the Arabic script

Official status
- Regulated by: Soqotri Language Center for Studies and Research

Language codes
- ISO 639-3: sqt
- Glottolog: soqo1240
- ELP: Soqoṭri

- Soqotri is classified as "severely endangered" by the UNESCO Atlas of the World's Languages in Danger

Soqotri (Note: autonym: ماتڸ دسقطري, romanized: mɛ́taḷ di-saḳɔ́ṭri; Arabic: اللغة السقطرية, romanized: al-luḡah al-suquṭriyyah) is a South Semitic language spoken by the Soqotrans on the islands of the Socotra Archipelago in Yemen. Soqotri is one of six languages that form a group called Modern South Arabian languages (MSAL). It is also spoken by Soqotri immigrants in the Gulf Arab states.

== Classification ==
Soqotri is often mistaken as a variety of Arabic but is typically classified as an Afro-Asiatic, Semitic, South Semitic and South Arabian language.

Scholars believe that there are no longer any grounds for associating the Modern South Arabian languages so directly with Arabic. They consider these dialects to be not Arabic, but Semitic languages in their own right.

== Dialects ==
The Soqotri dialectology is very rich, especially considering the island's surface area and the number of inhabitants. Soqotri speakers live on their islands, but rarely on the Yemeni mainland. The language was, throughout its history, isolated from the Arabian mainland. Arabic is also spoken in a dialectal form on Socotra.

There are three main dialects of Soqotri: Eastern Soqotri Dialect, Central Soqotri Dialect and Western Soqotri Dialect.

== Geographic distribution ==
The total population of Soqotri users throughout Yemen is 57,000 (1990 census), and total users in all countries is 71,400. The language is also spoken by Soqotri immigrants in the Gulf Arab states, mainly in Ajman in the United Arab Emirates.

=== Official status ===
Soqotri has no official status. It is a language of Yemen where it is spoken mainly on the islands of the Socotra Governorate: 'Abd al Kuri, Darsah, Samha, and Soqotra islands in the Gulf of Aden.

== Status ==
=== Endangerment ===
Arabic is now the symbolic, or more ideological, articulation of the nation's identity, making it the privileged lingua franca of the nation. The government has also taken up an inclination of neglect toward the Soqotri language. This seems to based on the view that Soqotri is only a dialect rather than a language itself. There is also no cultural policy on what should be done about the remaining oral non-Arabic languages of Yemen, include Soqotri and Mehri. The language is seen as an impediment to progress because of the new generation's judgement of it as being irrelevant in helping to improve the socio-economic status of the island. Limitations to Soqotri, such as not being able to communicate through writing, are also viewed as obstacles by the youth that makes up 60% of the population. There seems to be cultural sentiments toward the language but yet an indifference due to neglect and the notion of hindrance associated with it.

Hence, Soqotri is regarded as a severely endangered language and a main concern toward the lack of research in Soqotri language field is not only related to the semitics, but to the Soqotri folklore heritage conservation. This isolated island has high pressures of modernization and with a rapidly changing cultural environment, there is a possibility of losing valuable strata of the Soqotran folklore heritage.

Poetry and song used to be a normal part of everyday life for people on the island, a way of communicating with others, no matter if they were human, animal, spirits of the dead, jinn sorcerers, or the divine. However, Soqotri poetry has been overlooked and the skill of the island's poets ignored.

== Phonology ==
Soqotri consonants
		Labial	Alveolar		Palatal	Velar	Pharyngeal	Glottal
		Labial	median	lateral	Palatal	Velar	Pharyngeal	Glottal
Nasal		m	n					
Plosive	voiceless		t		kʲ (Note: /k/ and /g/ are by default pronounced [kʲ] and [gʲ].)			ʔ
Plosive	voiced	b	d (Note: /d/ is pronounced [tˤ] word finally (e.g. /ˈsɛrɛd/ [ˈsɛrɛtˤ] "a grown-up kid").)		ɡʲ			
Plosive	emphatic		tˤ			kʼ		
Fricative	voiceless	f	s	ɬ	ʃ	x (Note: Native /x/ and /ɣ/ merged with /ħ/ and /ʕ/ in the Central-Eastern Dialects while they were preserved in the Western Dialects. /x/ and /ɣ/ were reintroduced in the Central-Eastern Dialects through Arabic loanwords like /ˈxalfe/ "window" and /ˈɣali/ "expensive" (compare Arabic /ɣaːliː/ "expensive").)	ħ	h
Fricative	voiced		z		ʒ	ɣ	ʕ (Note: /ʕ/ is pronounced [ˀħ] word finally (e.g. /ˈkʼalˠaʕ/ [ˈkʼalˠaˀħ] "he threw"). This sound also sporadically attested in word-medially in nouns and adjectives, compare [ˈmiˀħo] "small intestines" with its dual form [ˈmiʕi], It seems that in most cases a combination of ʕ + “parasitic h” is underlying, so that can be reanalyzed as /ˈmiʕho/ and /ˈmiʕi/.)	
Fricative	emphatic		sˤ (Note: /sˤ/ is partially voiced [s̬ˤ].)	ɮˤ	ʃˤ			
Rhotic			r (Note: /r/ is sporadically but not infrequently palatalized [rʲ] (e.g. /ˈrabaħ/ [ˈrʲabaħ]).)					
Approximant		w		l lˠ	j jʰ			

Soqotri vowels
	Front	Back
Close	i (Note: /i/ is pronounced as a diphthong [ɨʲ] after emphatics (/tˤ sˤ ʃˤ ɮˤ kʼ lˠ/) in open syllables and [ɨ] in closed syllables (e.g. /ʕaˈlˠiti/ [ʕa'lˠɨʲti] "two teeth", /sˤiˈtˤoʕo/ [sˤɨʲˈtˤoʕo] "she was hungry", /ˈmasˤil/ [ˈmasˤɨl] "he collected the gum of the dragon-blood tree").)	u (Note: /u/ is usually pronounced [ou] in free variation with the rarer pronunciation [u], but [u] is preferred in certain positions, notably in the vicinity of /ʔ/ and /ʕ/, and after /n/.)
Close-mid	e (Note: /e/ is usually pronounced [ɨ] when unstressed, and sometimes when stressed (e.g. /ʔeˈk’anem/ [ʔɨ'k’anɨm] "I feed", /ˈsejjod/ ['sɨjjotˤ]). After /ɬ ɮˤ j jʰ k g/ it is usually pronounced [i] (/ˈdeker/ ['dekʲir], /ˈjefoɬ/ ['jifoɬ]). An unstressed [e~ɨ] ([a] after /ħ/) is optionally inserted to break initial /CC-/ clusters and mandatorily after initial /CCC-/ clusters (e.g. /ʃbaħ/ [ʃ(e)ˈbaħ] "he stretched", /tħlˠɛf/ [tħaˈlˠɛf] "may she replace").) ø (Note: [ø] is usually a labialized allophone of /e/, typically occurring under stress before a labial (/m b f w/) or emphatic (/tˤ sˤ ʃˤ ɮˤ kʼ lˠ/) consonant if /o/ is present in the following syllable (e.g. /ˈfelˠho/ [ˈfølˠho] "calves", /ˈtebod/ [ˈtøbod] "she lies"). It can also appear as an allophone of /o/ after /ɬ ɮˤ j jʰ k g/ (e.g. /gobk/ [gʲøbk] "I suspected", /ˈɬoʔom/ ['ɬøʔom] "he sold") and in the passive form of suffix conjugation from roots IIIw/y (e.g. /beˈnøwe/ "it was built"). It does appear to have minimal pairs with /e/ in some verbal patterns, compare /ˈkʼøbor/ "he buried" and /ˈføsˤar/ "he squashed" with /ˈkʼeber/ "they buried" and /ˈfesˤar/ "it got squashed".)	o
Open-mid	ɛ	(ɔ) (Note: [ɔ] could be evaluated as a positional allophone of /o/, appearing usually but not exclusively in the neighborhood of the nasal (e.g. /fɔnɬ/ "breath", /geˈmɔhɔlˠ/ "she-camel"). But there are minimal pairs like /ho/ "I" and /hɔ/ [a form of address].)
Open	a (Note: In the verbal paradigm [a] acts like a positional allophone of /ɛ/ around pharyngeals. But in nouns and adjectives there are minimal pairs (e.g. /bar/ "strength", /bɛr/ "open place", /ˈnɛfaʕ/ "word", /ˈnafaʕ/ "he worked").)	
Nasal	ã ẽ (Note: The nasal vowels only appear in one word each, /ʕãj/ (< /ʕan/) and /kẽj/ (< /ken/) both mean "from him".)	

The isolation of the island of Socotra has led to the Soqotri language independently developing certain phonetic characteristics absent in even the closely related languages of the mainland. Soqotri lost interdentals θ, ð, and θʼ and merged them with t, d and tˤ: e.g. Soqotri has dor "blood" where Shehri has ðɔhr and Mehri has ðōrə; Soqotri has tˤarb (a piece of wood), where Shehri and Mehri have θʼarb; Soqotri tri/trɔ (two) where Shehri has θroh and Mehri has θərō.

Soqotri emphatics (except /lˠ/) used to be ejective consonants. However, ejectives have largely become pharyngealized consonants as in Arabic, with the exception of /kʼ/.

== Writing system ==
An Arabic-based alphabet for the Soqotri language was developed in 2014 by a Russian team led by Vitaly Naumkin after five years of work. It can be found in his book Corpus of Soqotri Oral Literature. This orthography has helped narrators of oral lore collaborate with researchers to compose literature truthful to its origins.

Romanization	IPA	Additional / Modified Soqotri Letter
ḷ	lˠ	ڸ
ŝ	ɬ	ڛ
ṣ̌	ʃˤ	ڞ
ž	ʒ	چ
g	ɡʲ	ﺝ

== Grammar ==
=== Personal pronouns ===
Soqotri has two sets of personal pronouns: independent or (free personal pronouns) and dependent or (bound personal pronouns). They inflect for person, number, and gender.

==== Independent personal pronouns ====
The independent or free personal pronouns are those that occur independently as separate words. They stand on their own as substitutes for nouns or noun phrases. They refer to persons or entities. They are sometimes referred to as subject pronouns since they can serve as the subjects of the verbs, and they correspond to the set of English subject pronouns. These pronouns show differences in gender (masculine and feminine), number (singular, dual, and plural), and person (first, second, and third). There is no neutral pronoun in the Soqotri because there is no neutral gender in this language. Everything is referred to either as masculine or as feminine. The following tables contain the independent personal pronouns in the three Soqotri dialects.

Independent Subject Personal Pronouns in the Eastern Soqotri Dialect
Person	Gender	Singular	Dual	Plural
1st	Masculine and Feminine	hɒh, "I"	kih, "we two"	ħɛn, "we"
2nd	Masculine	hæt, ʔəh, "you"	tih, "you two"	tæn, "you"
2nd	Feminine	hɪt, ʔɪh, "you"	tih, "you two"	tæn, "you"
3rd	Masculine	jhɛh, "he"	jɛhɛh, "they two"	jhæn, "they"
3rd	Feminine	sɛh, "she"	jɛhɛh, "they two"	sæn, "they

Independent Subject Personal Pronoun in the Soqotri Central Dialect
Person	Gender	Singular	Dual	Plural
1st	Masculine and Feminine	hɒh, "I"	kih, "we two"	ħɛn, "we"
2nd	Masculine	hət, ʔəh, "you"	tih, "you two"	tæn, "you"
2nd	Feminine	hɪt, ʔɪh, "you"	tih, "you two"	tæn, "you"
3rd	Masculine	jhɛh, "he"	jɛhɛh, "they two"	jhæn, "they"
3rd	Feminine	sɛh, "she"	jɛhɛh, "they two"	sæn, "they

Independent Subject Personal Pronouns in the Western Soqotri Dialect
Person	Gender	Singular	Dual	Plural
1st	Masculine and Feminine	ʔɛh, hɒh, "I"	kih, "we two"	ħɛn, "we"
2nd	Masculine	ʔət, "you"	tih, "you two"	tən, tæn, "you"
2nd	Feminine	ʔit, hɪt, "you"	tih, "you two"	tɛn, tæn, "you"
3rd	Masculine	jɛh, jhɛh, "he"	ji:h, jɛhɛh, "they two"	jən, jhæn, "they"
3rd	Feminine	sɛh, "she"	ji:h, "they two"	sɛn, sæn, "they"

==== Connective particle ====
Another linguistic uniqueness in the far-western dialect of Qafiz is the possessive construction. This dialect, like all other Soqotri dialects, is based in the connective d-, followed by a pronoun. However, in this dialect, the connective is variable (like the relative pronoun): d- with a singular, and l- with a plural:

dihet férham/ girl>'your (msg.) girl', des 'her'..., but lḥan, 'our', ltan 'your (pl.)', lyihan 'their (m.)', lisan 'their (f.)'.

This variation highlights the link between connective, deictic and relative pronoun. In other dialects, a grammaticalization process took place and the singular form was frozen as a connecting invariable particle d-.

=== Syntax ===
==== Agreement ====
In some dialects, the relative pronoun does not agree with plural:

le-ēfœ d- izeˤem b-fídəhɔn
DEI(PL)-people/ REL(SG)-that sit/ in-mountain
'this people that stay in the mountain' (Rujed).

In remote places, old people use the verbal, nominal and pronominal dual:

eṭahérö ho w-d-ho ḳaḳa ḳalansíye
we {go (1DU)/I-and-of-me/} younger brother/ Qalansiya
'I and my younger brother, we two go to Qalansiya'

but many native speakers (young people or people in contact with Arabic) do not use verbal dual regularly:

ˤeğébö təṭhár
{they want (3DU)} {go (SUBJ.3F.SG)}
'They (both) want to go'

and they use plural pronouns instead of the dual form:

tten férhem <of-your (pl.)/girl>'your girl' for /tti férhem/ 'your girl' (to you both).

Many people in contact with Arabic tend to use plural in all cases (verb or pronoun). Only the nominal dual occurs regularly.

==== Negation ====
Cf. above, about the phono-morphological explanation for the two forms of negation. In many dialects, the verbal negation is the same with indicative and prohibitive.

== Vocabulary ==
Lieutenant Wellstedt, who was part of a surveying mission in 1835, was the first to collect toponyms, tribe names, plant names, figures, and in total was able to put together a list of 236 Soqotri words. The words have no characteristics of the Western dialects and 41 words out of the 236 were noted as Arabic loans by Wellstedt. Some are really Arabic as beïdh (bayḍ) 'eggs' (ḳehélihen in Soqotri) or ˤajúz 'old woman' (Soqotri śíbīb), thob (tob) 'a shirt' (with interdental, absent from the Soqotri consonant system; tob in Soqotri means 'cloth'); many words belong to the old common Semitic vocabulary and are attested in both Arabic and Soqotri: edahn 'ears' (exactly ˤídəhen), ˤaṣábi 'fingers' (ˤəṣābe) etc. Religious poems show influence of Arabic with borrowings from classical Arabic vocabulary and Quranic expressions.

== Sample texts ==
The following examples are couplets, which is the basic building block of Soqotri poetry and song. This is a straightforward humorous piece about a stingy fisherman with easy language usage that anyone on the island could easily understand.

1. ber tībeb di-ģašonten / Abdullah di-halēhn
2. d-iķor di-hi sode / af teķolemen ٚeyh il-ārhen

Translation:

1. Everyone knows for certain that Abdullah is quite idiotic, walking here and there:
2. He's concealed his fish for so long that the bluebottles are swarming all around him!

The next example is a line that most Soqotrans would not find too difficult to understand either:

1. selleman enhe we-mātA / le-ha le-di-ol yahtite
2. di-ol ināsah ki-yiķtīni / lot erehon ki-gizol šeber

Literal translation:

1. Greet on my behalf and make certain my greetings reach the one over there who is quite without shame.
2. Who does not wipe his face clean when he has eaten, just like goats when they are feeding on the šeber plants

In order to understand this piece however, the listener has to know of the significance of the šeber plants. These plants, part of the Euphorbia plant group, survive long months of dry seasons and have a milky latex which goats often feed on in times of shortage. There is no nutritious benefit to it but, it helps rid of the goats' thirst. However, when goats feed on the latex from damaged plants, it stains their muzzles and causes sores in and around the mouth. The lines were made by a woman who had found out that her lover was bragging to others of his victories (he is being compared to the feeding goats). She is calling this out and warning other women to be careful of men of his like.
