= Hobyot =

Endangered Semitic language of Oman and Yemen

Hobyót
- Pronunciation: [həbjuːt], [hoːbjoːt]
- Native to: Yemen, Oman
- Native speakers: (500 cited 1998-2010)
- Language family: Afro-Asiatic: Semitic; West Semitic; South Semitic; Southeast Semitic; Hobyót

Language codes
- ISO 639-3: hoh
- Glottolog: hoby1242
- ELP: Hobyot

- Hobyót is classified as "severely endangered" by the UNESCO Atlas of the World's Languages in Danger

Hobyót (Arabic: لغة هوبيوت, also known as Hewbyót, Habyot, or Hobi), natively known as Weyheybyot, is one of the six Modern South Arabian languages (MSAL), a group of South Semitic languages spoken in the southern Arabian Peninsula. A severely-endangered Semitic language on the verge of extinction, it is spoken in a small area near the Yemen-Oman border. The speaking population is estimated to be about 1000 in Oman and 40 in Yemen, though the true number may be less.

Its usage is less associated with a specific community or tribe of people, and more related to the geographical area in which it is spoken (the mountainous Dhufar/Yemen border). Much of the information regarding Hobyot's existence originated through the study of the more dominant, neighboring Modern South Arabian languages like Mehri and Jibbali. A clear linguistic description of Hobyot is difficult, as many speakers mix Mehri into their speech around outsiders.

In recent years, individual studies of Hobyot have provided sufficient evidence to prove its linguistic independence, and have given insight into the history and culture of its speakers. Documentation of its complete structure, however, has yet to be completed.

== History of documentation ==
Linguists first mentioned Hobyot in 1981 with a publication done by Thomas Muir Johnstone, though he initially discovered it in the 1970s. Johnstone hypothesized that it was actually a fusion of the more popular Mehri and Jibbali dialects of the MSAL rather than a definitive language in its own right. It would not be distinguished as its own language until 1985, when Marie-Claude Simeone-Sinelle published enough evidence to reveal distinction from its MSAL counterparts. It is now widely understood that a sufficient number of individual linguistic features has proved Hobyot's independence as its own language.

Some believe that Hobyot speakers consider their language to be a mixture of Shahri and Mehri. More documentation of the language is anticipated to arrive in the near future, as two modern research groups from the UK and France have been conducting field work in the hopes of shedding greater light on its nature.

A preliminary detailing of some phonological and grammatical differences between Hobyot can be found in works done by Simeone-Senelle; specifically, in her work on its usage in Yemen and Oman.

== Geographic distribution ==
Given its location at the border of two countries, Hobyot is the shared language of people of differing origins. While speakers are mostly found on both sides of the mountainous border between Yemen and Oman, some can be found in desert areas to the north and west, as well as fishing communities on the coast. The misinterpretation of Hobyot as a part of either Mehri or Jibbali may stem from the fact that most Hobyot speakers came into contact with Jibbali speakers in the mountains, and Mahra speakers in the deserts and coastal areas.

Hobyot speakers identify with the Mahra (Mehri) tribe, according to Hetzron's book on the Semitic languages. They are located within the Mehri area. In the mountains, they breed camels, cows, and goats, while escaping in caves and settlements of roundhouses during the monsoons.

Most Hobyot speakers along the coasts are multilingual, and often have some understanding of Mehri or Mehriyot, even if they are not fluent. Influence by either Jibbali, Mehri, or Mehriyot depends upon linguistic proximity. For example, Hobyot spoken in Yemen is closer to Mehriyot on the coast and Jibbali in the mountains.

== Phonology ==
=== Consonants ===
| | | Labial | Inter- dental | Dental/ Alveolar | | Postalveolar/ Palatal | Velar | Uvular | Pharyngeal | Glottal |
| | | Labial | Inter- dental | plain | lateral | Postalveolar/ Palatal | Velar | Uvular | Pharyngeal | Glottal |
|---|---|---|---|---|---|---|---|---|---|---|
| Nasal | | m | | n | | | | | | |
| Plosive/ Affricate | voiceless | | | t | | (tʃ) | k | (q) | | ʔ |
| Plosive/ Affricate | voiced | b | | d | | dʒ | (ɡ) | | | |
| Plosive/ Affricate | glottalic | | | tʼ~tˀ | | | kʼ~kˀ | | | |
| Fricative | voiceless | f | θ | s | ɬ | ʃ | | χ | ħ | h |
| Fricative | voiced | | ð | z | | (ʒ) | | ʁ | | |
| Fricative | glottalic | | θʼ~θˀ | s’~sˀ | ɬʼ~ɬˀ | ʃʼ~ʃˀ | | | | |
| Rhotic | | | | r | | | | | | |
| Approximant | | | | | l | j | w | | | |

Sounds in parentheses are rare, or are from loanwords.

- Other pharyngealized sounds /tˤ, ðˤ, lˤ/, are rare or are from loan words.
- /ɡ/ may also be heard as a palatal stop [ɟ].
- Glottalic sounds can be heard as either ejectives or glottalized sounds.

=== Vowels ===
| | Front | Central | Back |
|---|---|---|---|
| Close | i | | u |
| Mid | e | ə | o |
| Open | | a | |

== Endangerment ==
Hobyot is considered a critically endangered language. The actual number of speakers is unknown, but it is estimated to be only a few hundred. Most of those who maintain the language are elderly, which adds to the likelihood that language extinction is near.

Ethnologue categorizes it as a moribund language (EGIDS 8a). The only fluent speakers that are left are older than the child-bearing age, which ultimately makes integration of the language into subsequent generations highly improbable. Mechanisms of transmission would have to be created from outside the community in order to preserve it.
