= Baṭḥari language =

Afro-Asiatic language of Oman

Bathari
- Batahari
- Pronunciation: [batˤħari]
- Native to: Oman
- Region: Dhofar Province
- Native speakers: 16 (2016)
- Language family: Afro-Asiatic: Semitic; West Semitic; South Semitic; Southeast Semitic; Bathari

Language codes
- ISO 639-3: bhm
- Glottolog: bath1244
- ELP: Baṭḥari
- Modern South Arabian Languages

- Bathari is classified as "critically endangered" by the UNESCO Atlas of the World's Languages in Danger

Baṭḥari (Arabic: اللغة البطحرية "Baṭḥari language"), natively known as Bəṭaḥrēt, is a nearly extinct Afro-Asiatic language of Oman, located on the southeast coast facing the Khuriya Muriya Islands.

The first westerner to acknowledge the existence of Bathari was Bertram Thomas in 1929.

== Name ==
The name Bathari has been variously rendered: Batahari, Bautahari, Botahari, Bathara.

The stress always falls on the last long syllable in Bathari, unless the stress unit is only composed of short syllables. In this case, the first syllable is stressed. As with other Modern South Arabian languages, Bathari nouns have two genders (masculine and feminine) and three numbers (singular, dual and plural), but the dual is reportedly obsolete. The ending -(v)t marks feminine nouns, apart from loanwords from Arabic that end in -h'.' Also, it is not Shahri but Bathari which retains (or perhaps has retaken, from Arabic) the Arabic-like 'ain.

Some Bathari words were mentioned in Johnstone's Mehri Lexicon and Jibbali Lexicon (1981). Stroomer affirms that it is a dialect of Mehri (p. xii), whereas Simeone-Senelle considers it a separate language. She does admit, however, that Bathari, along with Harsusi, is closely related to Mehri.

The most important steps towards a comprehensive descriptive grammar of Bathari language were made by Gasparini (2018). An extensive descriptive grammar and a collection of transcribed texts have been recently published.

== Threat of Extinction ==
In addition to the threat of Arabic, Mehri also threatens to replace the Bathari language due to its less prestigious position. The tribe seems to be dying out with the language also under threat from modern education solely in Arabic. The Bathari language is nearly extinct. Estimates are that the number of remaining speakers are under 100. In 2016, Janet Watson gave an estimate of 12 to 20 (in “Language, Culture, and the Environment”). In 2019, the UAE's The National newspaper put the number of remaining elderly fluent speakers left at just 12 to 17, as well as a few dozen middle-aged speakers who mixed it with Arabic.
