= Shehri language =

Modern South Arabian language of southwest Oman

Shehri
- Jibbali
- Śḥɛrɛ̄t, Gəblɛ̄t
- Pronunciation: [dʒibbaːli]
- Native to: Oman
- Region: Dhofar
- Native speakers: 89,000 (2024)
- Language family: Afro-Asiatic: Semitic; West Semitic; South Semitic; Southeast Semitic; Shehri

Language codes
- ISO 639-3: shv
- Glottolog: sheh1240
- ELP: Jibbali

- Jibbali is classified as "severely endangered" by the UNESCO Atlas of the World's Languages in Danger

Shehri, (Note: autonym: Śḥɛrɛ̄t/Śḥerɛ̄t/Śḥərɛ̄t, lit. 'the language of the śḥɛr [mountains]'; Arabic: اللغة الشحرية) also known as Jibbali, (Note: autonym: Gəblɛ̄t; Arabic: اللغة الجبالية) is a Modern South Arabian language. It, along with the three island varieties of Soqoṭri, comprises the eastern branch of Modern South Arabian. The language is chiefly spoken by two groups of people, whose autonyms are Śḥɛrí (plural Śḥɛró) and Əḥklí (plural Əḥkló) respectively. They inhabit the coastal towns, the mountains, and wilderness areas upland from Salalah, located in the Dhofar Governorate in southern Oman.

== Overview ==
Shehri (Jibbali, Geblet, Sheret, Šehri, Šhauri, Shahari, Jibali, Ehkili, Qarawi, and Garawi) is spoken along a dialect continuum that includes Western Jibbali, Central Jibbali, and Eastern Jibbali. The dialect used by the few inhabitants of Al-Hallaniyah in the Khuriya Muriya Islands is sometimes known as 'Baby' Jibbali. Speakers generally live a semi-nomadic culture, rearing cows and camels in the mountains. The dialects themselves contain only minor variances and are highly intelligible.

Like most Modern South Arabian dialect speakers in Oman and Yemen, many Shehri speakers are bilingual in local dialects of Arabic especially the Dhofari dialect. In addition, it is primarily a spoken language, and there is no tradition of writing or publishing in the language. Pressure from Arabic has forced many changes in the language, so much so that young speakers use noticeably different grammar.

== Phonology ==
=== Consonants ===
		Labial	Inter- dental	Dental/ Alveolar		Postalveolar/ Palatal		Velar	Uvular	Pharyngeal	Glottal
		Labial	Inter- dental	plain	lateral	plain	sibilant	Velar	Uvular	Pharyngeal	Glottal
Nasal		m		n							
Plosive	voiceless			t				k			(ʔ)
Plosive	voiced	b		d		(ɟ)		ɡ			
Plosive	emphatic			tˀ~tʼ				kˀ~kʼ			
Fricative	voiceless	f	θ	s	ɬ	ç	ʃ		χ	ħ	h
Fricative	voiced		ð	z	(ɮ)	(ʝ)			ʁ	ʕ	
Fricative	emphatic		ðˀ~ðʼ	sˀ~s’	ɬˀ~ɬʼ	(çˀ~çʼ)	ʃˀ~ʃʼ				
Rhotic				r							
Approximant					l	j		w			

- The emphatic sounds might be pronounced as an ejective or pharyngealized sound depending on variety, speaker, and phonological environment. Emphatics are never aspirated, and when not glottalized, they are usually partially voiced.
- The sound /ɡ/ can be palatalized as [ɟ] or [ɡʲ] in the Central and Eastern Jibbali dialects. In Western Jibbali, it is pronounced as [dʒ].
  - [ʝ] only occurs as an allophone of /ɡ/, and can variously be pronounced as [ʝ], [ʒ], or [ɟ].
- Whistled sibilant sounds [sᶲʼ, sᶲ] may also be heard, however they are rare sounds and mostly heard as allophones of /ʃʼ, ʃ/. Historically [sᶲʼ] was an allophone of /kʼ/. It is now typically mostly pronounced as [ʃʼ] by most speakers of the language.
- The whistled sibilant [sᶲ] was historically an allophone of /k/ but also derives from older clusters like *st. According to Johnstone, it was pronounced with approximately the same tongue position as /ʃ/ but there is no contact between the top of the tongue and the alveolum, the air is pushed out over the tongue and the lips are simultaneously rounded and pouted.
  - [sᶲ] is distinguished from /ʃ/ as a separate phoneme /sᶲ/, by only among some speakers of Central Jibbali. Otherwise, both are pronounced as [ʃ].
- [çˀ~çʼ] is a rare sound and is an allophone of /kˀ/. It is also typically pronounced as [ʃˀ~ʃʼ] by most speakers of the language.
- [ç] and [ʃ] are distinguished only among some speakers of Central Jibbali. Otherwise, both are pronounced as [ʃ].
- /ɬʼ/ is usually pronounced with some affrication.
- [ɮ] occurs as an allophone of /l/ but never word-initially. Some speakers of Eastern Jibbali might have merged [ɮ] with /ɬʼ/
- [ʔ] is typically only heard in word-final position, and is not considered as phonemic.

=== Vowels ===
	Front	Central	Back
Close	i		u
Close-mid	e	ə	o
Open-mid	ɛ	ə	ɔ
Open		a	

- /ə/ is a common vowel but only marginally phonemic, as it mostly represents an epenthetic vowel. When in stressed positions, /ə/ can also be realized as [ɪ].
- /i/ and /e/ are distinct phonemes, but in some contexts may be interchangeable (e.g. /ˈdifər/~/ˈdefər/ ‘bad’). The vowel /e/ is also raised to /i/ in the vicinity of a nasal consonant and sometimes in the vicinity of a /r/.
- The vowel [a] is not phonemic, it is an allophone of /ɛ/ and /ə/ in the vicinity of a guttural consonant (/χ/, /ʁ/, /ħ/, /ʕ/, or /h/). When following the consonants /ʁ/ and /ʕ/ [a] is pronounced with a slight diphthongization by some speakers, e.g. /ˈʕɛgəb/ ‘he wants’ can be pronounced [ˈʕagəb] or [ˈʕajgəb] and /ʁɛbˈgɔt/ ‘girl’ can be pronounced [ʁabˈgɔtʰ] or [ʁajbˈgɔtʰ].
- It is not clear if [o] and [ɔ] are distinct phonemes, in many contexts they seem to be interchangeable. Notably, [ɔ] is much more common than [o].
- /u/ is a distinct phoneme but most instances of it are from the raising of [o]/[ɔ] to [u] the vicinity of a nasal consonant. It is considered a distinct phoneme outside of that context, like in [ˈtʰuʒər] ‘rich’ and [ˈħuʃ] ‘enclosure, pen’.
- The vowels, with the exception of /ə/, have long counterparts. The long vowels are the result of elision due to the loss of historical *b, *m, *ʔ, *w, *y. Occasionally, the sequence [ʕa] or [aʕ] is realized as [aː]. Vowel length is only marginally phonemic, and minimal pairs are very few.
- The vowels, with the exception of /ə/, have nasalized counterparts, but [ẽ] and [ɔ̃] are rare. The nasalized vowels are the result of elision of historical *m or *n with only a few exceptions like [ɛ̃hɛ̃] ‘yes’ and the particles [hɛ̃] and [hũk]. At least some of these nasalized vowels are phonemic, though minimal pairs are very few and which of these vowels is phonemic is unclear.
- The vowel system is made up of an 8-member set, containing the normal Semitic i-u-a, along with tense and lax vowels, and a central vowel. The vowel set is: i, e, Ó, Í, a, Ã, o, u. The difference between the long and short vowels is not always just phonological.

== Grammar ==
Nouns have an either masculine or feminine gender. Feminine markers use the endings of –(V)t or –h, as in Arabic. Unlike Arabic, the dual number marker is not used in nouns, and is instead replaced by a suffix of the numeral 2 itself. Dual pronouns are no longer used by the youth, replaced by plural pronouns.

Simple verb conjugations have two separate classes, with differing conjugations for perfect, imperfect, and subjunctive cases. Verbal clauses always take the order of VSO (Verb–subject–object) or SVO (Subject–verb–object). If the subject is an independent pronoun, it is placed before the verb. Guttural verbs have their own pattern. Verb classifications are intensive-conative, causative, reflexive (with infixed -t-), and causative-reflexive. In future verbs, a preverb ha-/h- precedes the subjunctive.

The numbers 1 and 2 act as adjectives. Between 3 and 10, masculine numbers enumerate feminine nouns, and feminine numbers enumerate masculine nouns. There is gender agreement between the number and nouns from 11 to 19. Beyond that, the structure is tens, “and”, and the unit. This is similar to Arabic counting. Livestock counting presents a special case that deviates from Arabic, instead using an ancient Bedouin system. Beyond 13, the noun used is either plural or singular.
