= Modern South Arabian =

Group of South Semitic languages of Arabia and Socotra

- Eastern South Semitic, Southeastern Semitic
- Geographic distribution: Yemen and Oman
- Linguistic classification: Afro-Asiatic: Semitic; West Semitic; South Semitic; Modern South Arabian
- Subdivisions: Bathari; Ḥarsusi; Hobyót; Mehri; Shehri; Soqotri

Language codes
- Glottolog: mode1252

The Modern South Arabian languages, also known as Eastern South Semitic languages, are a group of endangered languages spoken by small populations inhabiting the Arabian Peninsula, in Yemen (including Socotra) and Oman. Together with the Ethiosemitic and Sayhadic languages, the Western branch, they form the South Semitic sub-branch of the Afroasiatic language family's Semitic branch.

Mehri and Hobyot are spoken in both Yemen and Oman. Soqotri is only spoken in the Yemeni archipelago of Socotra, and the Harsusi, Bathari, and Shehri languages are only spoken in Oman.

== Classification ==
In his glottochronology-based classification, Alexander Militarev presents the Modern South Arabian languages as a South Semitic branch opposed to a North Semitic branch that includes all the other Semitic languages. They are no longer considered to be descendants of the Old South Arabian language, as was once thought, but instead "nephews".

== Languages ==
- Mehri: It is the largest Modern South Arabian language. As of 2024, there are about 250,300 speakers of this language, 190,000 of whom live in Yemen. The language is spoken by the Mehri people.
- Soqotri: another relatively numerous example, with speakers exclusively on the Yemeni island of Socotra. As of 2012, there were around 60,000 speakers.
- Shehri: also called Jibbali, meaning "of the Mountains", is spoken in the Dhofar Governorate of Oman, with an estimated 10–30,000 speakers; it was used by the revolutionaries during the Dhofar Rebellion along the border with Yemen in the 1960s and 1970s.
- Harsusi: under 1,000 speakers in the Jiddat al-Harasis of Oman.
- Bathari: Under 100 speakers in Dhofar. Located on the southeast coast facing the Khuriya Muriya Islands. Very similar to Mehri, and some tribespeople speak Mehri instead of Bathari.
- Hobyót: under 1,000 speakers, along the Omani-Yemeni borders.

== Phonology ==
Modern South Arabian languages are known for their apparent archaic Semitic features, especially in their system of phonology. For example, they preserve the lateral fricatives *ś [ɬ] and *ṣ́/ḏ̣ [ɬʼ] of Proto-Semitic.

Modern South Arabian languages maintain the distinction which is lost in all spoken Arabic dialects but preserved in Classical Arabic between the two coronal emphatics represented by the Arabic letters ض /dˤ/ ḍād and ظ /ðˤ/ ẓāʾ. In contrast to Arabic, where this distinction is represented by a stop-continuant contrast at the alveolar or pre-dental place of articulation, Modern South Arabian languages preserve a lateral-central distinction (ض /ɬʼ/ vs. ظ /θʼ ~ ðʼ/). The lateral ض /ɬʼ/ is the emphatic counterpart to the lateral /ɬ/, which has become iconic of the Modern South Arabian languages, owing to its relative rarity in the world’s languages.

Semiticists are nearly unanimous in the opinion that Proto-Semitic contained three plain sibilants, referred to by the shorthand *s1, *s2, and *s3, and confusing also as š, ś, and s. The realizations of these phonemes in earlier times is debated, these three plain sibilants have been preserved in Mehri and Shehri, on the other hand in Arabic *s and *š merged into Arabic /s/ ⟨س⟩ and *ś became Arabic /ʃ/ ⟨ش⟩.

Proto-Semitic		Soqotri	Mehri	Shehri (Jibbali)	Standard Arabic	
s₁ (š)	[ʃ] / [s]	[ʃ] (sometimes [h], [jʱ])	[ʃ] (sometimes [h])	[ʃ], [ç]	[s]	س
s₃ (s)	[s] / [ts]	[s]			[s]	س
s₂ (ś)	[ɬ]	[ɬ]			[ʃ]	ش
ṣ́	[ɬʼ] / [tɬʼ]	[ɬʼ]			[dˤ]	ض
ṯ̣	[θʼ]	[tʼ]	[θʼ ~ ðʼ]		[ðˤ]	ظ
ṯ	[θ]	[t]	[θ]			ث
ḏ	[ð]	[d]	[ð]			ذ

== Origins ==
Militarev identified a Cushitic substratum in Modern South Arabian, which he proposes is evidence that Cushitic speakers originally inhabited the Arabian Peninsula alongside Semitic speakers. According to Václav Blažek, this suggests that Semitic peoples assimilated their original Cushitic neighbours to the south who did not later emigrate to the Horn of Africa. He argues that the Levant would thus have been the Proto-Afro-Asiatic Urheimat, from where the various branches of the Afro-Asiatic family subsequently dispersed. To further support this, Blažek cites analysis of rock art in Central Arabia by Anati, which notes a connection between the shield-carrying "oval-headed" people depicted on the cave paintings and the Arabian Cushites from the Old Testament, who were similarly described as carrying specific shields.

== Reconstruction ==
Proto-Modern South Arabian reconstructions by Roger Blench (2019):

Gloss	singular	plural
one	*tʕaad, *tʕiit	
two	*ṯrooh, *ṯereṯ	
three	*ʃahṯayt	
four	*ʔorbaʕ, *raboot	
five	*xəmmoh	
six	m. *ʃɛɛt, f. *ʃətəət	
seven	m. *ʃoobeet, f. *ʃəbət	
eight	m. θəmoonit, f. θəmoonit	
nine	m. *saʕeet, f. *saaʕet	
ten	m. *ʕɔ́ɬər, f. *ʕəɬiireet	
head	*ḥəəreeh	
eye	*ʔaayn	*ʔaayəəntən
ear	*ʔeyðeen	*ʔiðānten
nose	*nəxreer	*nəxroor
mouth	*xah	*xwuutən
hair	*ɬəfeet	*ɬéef
hand/arm	*ḥayd	*ḥaadootən
leg	*faaʕm	*fʕamtən
foot	*géedəl	*(ha-)gdool
blood	*ðoor	*ðiiriín
breast	*θɔɔdɛʔ	*θədií
belly	*hóofəl	*hefool
sea	*rɛ́mrəm	*roorəm
path, road	*ḥóorəm	*ḥiiraám
mountain	*kərmām	*kərəəmoom
rock, stone	*ṣar(fét)	*ṣeref
rock, stone	*ṣəwər(fet)	*ṣəfáyr
rock, stone	*ʔoobən	
rock, stone	*fúdún	
fish	*ṣódəh	*ṣyood
hyena	*θəbiiriin	
turtle	*ḥameseh	*ḥoms(tə)
louse	*kenemoot	*kenoom
man	*ɣayg	*ɣəyuug
woman	*teeθ	
male child	*ɣeg	
child	*mber	
water	*ḥəmooh	
fire	*ɬəweeṭ	*ɬewṭeen
milk	*ɬxoof	*ɬxefən
salt	*məɮḥɔ́t	
night	*ʔaṣeer	*leyli
day	*ḥəyoomet	PWMSA *yiim
net	PWMSA *liix	*leyuux
wind	*mədenut	*medáyten
I, we	*hoh	*nəhan
you, m.	*heet	*ʔəteem
you, f.	*hiit	*ʔeteen
he, they m.	*heh	*həəm
she, they f.	*seeh	*seen

== Bibliography ==
- Johnstone, T.M. (1975). "The Modern South Arabian Languages". Afroasiatic Linguistics. 1 (5): 93–121.
- Johnstone, T.M. (1977). Ḥarsūsi Lexicon and English-Ḥarsūsi Word-List. London: Oxford University Press.
- Johnstone, T.M. (1981). Jibbāli Lexicon. London: Oxford University Press.
- Johnstone, T.M. (1987). Mehri Lexicon and English-Mehri Word-List. London: School of Oriental and African Studies.
- Nakano, Aki’o (1986). Comparative Vocabulary of Southern Arabic: Mahri, Gibbali, and Soqotri. Tokyo: Institute for the Study of Languages and Cultures of Asia and Africa.
- Nakano, Aki’o (2013). Ratcliffe, Robert (ed.). Hōbyot (Oman) Vocabulary: With Example Texts. Tokyo: Research Institute for Languages and Cultures of Asia and Africa.
- Naumkin, Vitaly; et al. (2014). Corpus of Soqotri Oral Literature. Vol. 1. Leiden: Brill.
- Rubin, Aaron D. (2010). The Mehri Language of Oman. Leiden: Brill.
- Rubin, Aaron D. (2014). The Jibbali Language of Oman: Grammar and Texts. Leiden: Brill.
- Watson, Janet C.E. (2012). The Structure of Mehri. Wiesbaden: Harrassowitz.
