= West Semitic languages =

Group of Semitic Languages

West Semitic
- Levantic
- Geographic distribution: Middle East
- Linguistic classification: Afro-Asiatic: Semitic; West Semitic
- Subdivisions: Central Semitic; South Semitic (controversial grouping)

Language codes
- Glottolog: west2786

The West Semitic languages are a proposed major sub-grouping of Semitic languages, the other being the long-extinct East Semitic languages division. The term was coined in 1883 by Fritz Hommel.

The grouping supported by Semiticists like Robert Hetzron and John Huehnergard divides the Semitic language family into two branches: Eastern and Western.

The West Semitic languages consist of the clearly defined sub-groups: Arabic (including Maltese), Ethiopic, Modern South Arabian, Old South Arabian, and Northwest Semitic (this including Hebrew, Aramaic, and the extinct Amorite and Ugaritic languages).

The East Semitic languages, meanwhile, consist of the extinct Eblaite and Akkadian languages.

Ethiopic and South Arabian show particular common features, and are often grouped together as South Semitic. The proper classification of Arabic with respect to other Semitic languages is debated. In older classifications, it is grouped with the South Semitic languages. However, Hetzron and Huehnergard connect it more closely with the Northwest Semitic languages, to form Central Semitic. Some Semiticists continue to argue for the older classification, based on the distinctive feature of broken plurals.

== Sources ==
- Faber, Alice (2013) [2006]. "Genetic Subgrouping of the Semitic Languages". In Hetzron, Robert (ed.). The Semitic languages. Routledge language family descriptions. London: Routledge. pp. 3–15. ISBN 978-0-415-41266-7.
