= Khawlan =

Ancient Yemeni tribe

Khawlan: خولان (Arabic); 𐩭𐩥𐩡𐩬 (Sabaean)
- Himyarite Arab Tribe
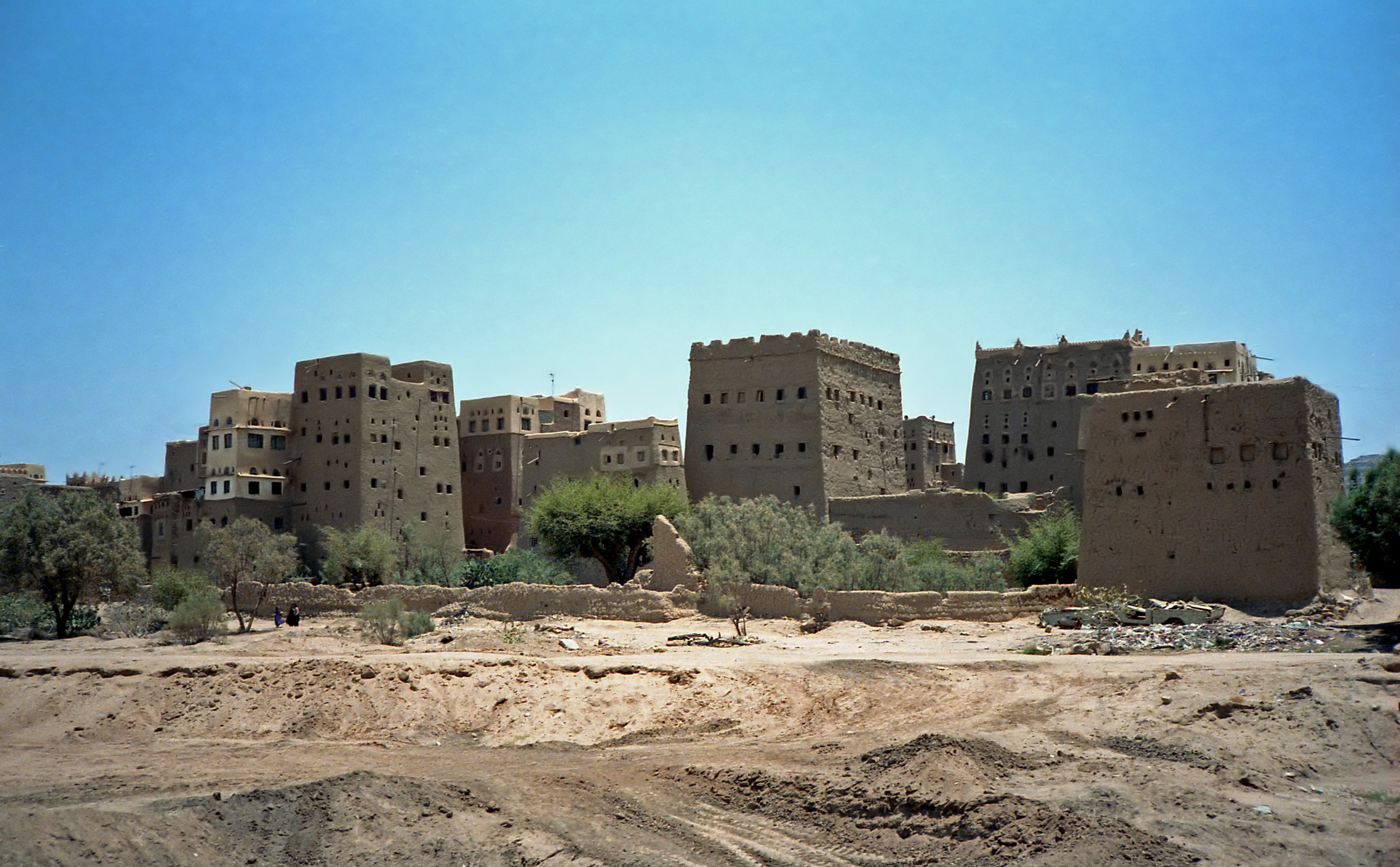
- Buildings from the old city of Saada, which is a part of Khawlan Bin Amer
- Nisba: Al-Khawlani
- Location: Saudi Arabia; Yemen
- Branches: Khawlan Al-Tiyal; Johm; Bani Shadad; Bani Jabr; Bani Dhabyan; Bani Saham; Bani Bahlul; Al-Sahman; Bani Al-A'roush; Qarwa; Khawlān bin ʿĀmir; Rāziḥ; Khawlān; Jumāʿah; Fayfāʾ; Banī Mālik; Saḥār; Munabbih; Balghāzī
- Language: Arabic, Himyaritic, Razihi, Faifi
- Religion: Islam

Khawlan (Arabic: خولان, Sabaean: 𐩭𐩥𐩡𐩬) is an ancient Himyarite Arab tribe that archeologists view as one of the old tribes of Yemen that were contemporary to the kingdoms of Saba and Ma'in. Today, two distinct tribal groups in Yemen bear this name: Khawlān b. ʿĀmir in the Ṣaʿdah governorate and the Saudi Jīzān province, and Khawlan al-Tiyal/al-Aaliyah (Arabic: خولان الطيال/العالية) in Ma'rib, Sana'a, and al-Bayda governorates. Khawlan al-Tiyal means (Khawlan of the highlands) as it is situated on one of the highest points in Yemen. Despite sharing the name Khawlān, these two groups are genealogically and organizationally distinct: Khawlān al-Ṭiyāl is a tribe of the Bakīl confederation, whereas Khawlān b. ʿĀmir constitutes its own independent tribal confederation in western Ṣaʿdah province.

The name "Khawlān" is ambiguous, as it can refer either to the overall confederation descended from the eponymous ancestor Khawlān b. ʿĀmir, to the Khawlān b. ʿĀmir federation's homonymous member tribe Khawlān that retains the ancestral name, or to the entirely separate tribe of Khawlān al-Ṭiyāl east of Sana'a, which is a member tribe of the Bakīl confederation. Neither chroniclers nor tribesmen always define their terms precisely, and the intended meaning frequently has to be judged from context.

The tribe was first mentioned in Sabean scriptures as (Kholn) in the 7th century BCE, and Khawlān b. ʿĀmir (Arabic: خولان بن عامر) in the Saada governorate and the Jazan Province (Sarawat Mountains). They are mentioned in Sabean scriptures as (Kholn Jddn) which means, new Khawlan. The genealogists have inserted Khawlan into several genealogical patterns, so they are Khawlan bin Qahtan in one saying, Khawlan from Quda'a in another, and Khawlan from Kahlan in a saying. al-Hamdani: "Khawlan Al-Tiyal are Kahlanites, while Khawlan bin Amer are Quda'ites of Himyarite origin" thus separating between them, and Nashwan al-Himyari opposed him in that, saying that both branches belong to Quda’a.

== Origins ==
The genealogists differed in the lineage of Khawlan, and in that Badr al-Din al-Ayni said: "Al-Hamdani narrated in his book (Al-Iklil) saying: Khawlan bin Amer bin Al-Haf bin Quda’a, and Khawlan bin Amer bin Malik bin Al-Harith bin Murra bin Adad. He said: And Khawlan Hadhur and Khawlan Rad’a are sons of Qahtan." Old Sabaean scriptures written in Musnad script refer to Khawlan and Sanhan several times and they are always mentioned together, which suggests that they and Sanhan live close to the same area.

It is noteworthy that this applies to both Khawlan Al-Tiyal and Sanhan in Sana'a and to the tribe of Khawlan bin Amer who live close to Sanhan Qahtan, and Jawad Ali said about Khawlan: "Khawlan is one of the large and powerful tribes that were mentioned in a large number of South Arabian writings, and we saw their name shining in the days of the Minaeans. It was mentioned that they attacked with the Sabeans a Minaean caravan led by 'Kabiran', and the Minaeans praised their gods and thanked them for the salvation of this caravan, and it is one of the living and fortunate Arab tribes; because it is still known, and it has an old history that we can ascend to the first millennium BC."

== Branches of Khawlan ==
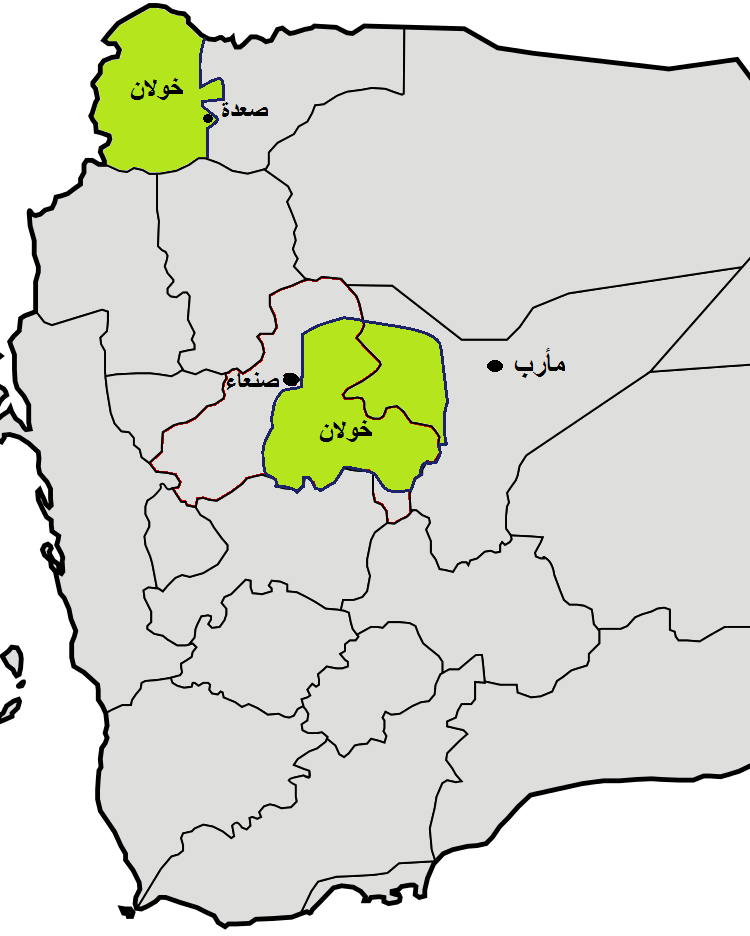
A map of Khawlan in Yemen

There are two tribes with the name Khawlan which are Khawlan al-Tiyal in the governorates of Sana'a, Marib, and al-Bayda, and Khawlan bin Amir in the governorate of Saada and the Jazan province. On this accord, The historian al-Hamdani said:

"Khawlan Al-Aaliya are the sons of Khawlan bin Amer bin Malik bin Al-Harith bin Murra bin Adad bin Omar bin Arib bin Zaid bin Kahlan bin Saba. And this is contrary to what Khawlan al-Aaliya are on, for they are from the beginning of time to the end of it affiliated to Himyar, and they do not deny their brothers from Khawlan bin Amer bin Al-Haf in Saada and its surroundings. And Khawlan Al-Aaliya was only said, to distinguish between the countries, not lineages, as it is said Azd Shanu’a and Azd Oman and there is no doubt that everyone is from Azd, and as it is said Tayy al-Sahl and Tayy al-Jabal, and Khawlan Al-Sham and Khawlan Al-Yemen and Hamdan al-Jibal and Hamdan al-Bun and Azd Sha’b and Azd Matrah and others."

— Abu Muhammad al-Hasan al-Hamdani, Al-Iklil, 293/10

=== Khawlan bin Amir ===
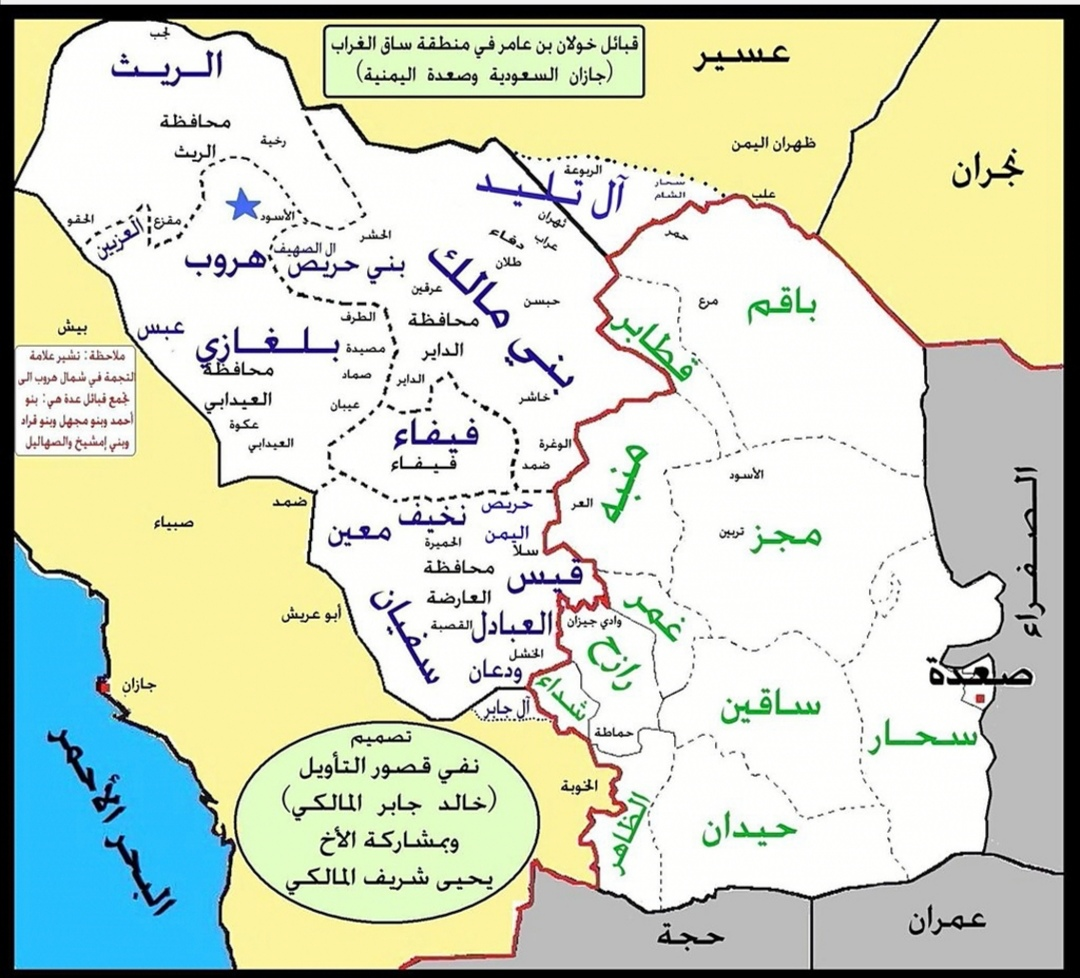
A map of Khawlan bin Amer

The confederation of Khawlān b. ʿĀmir is also known as Khawlān b. ʿAmrū (خولان بن عمرو), Khawlān b. Quḍāʿah (خولان بن قضاعة), or Khawlān al-Shām (خولان الشام). It is divided into two moieties: Furūd and Yahāniyyah. Yahāniyyah includes five member tribes: Rāziḥ, Khawlān (a homonymous member tribe retaining the ancestral name), Jumāʿa, Fayfāʾ, and Banī Mālik. Furūd includes three member tribes: Saḥār, Munabbih, and Balghāzī. Each of these eight member tribes again subdivides into moieties, which are further subdivided into numerous sub-sections. The settlement area of Khawlān b. ʿĀmir is located in western Ṣaʿdah governorate. The territory of the five Yemeni member tribes reaches from a few miles east of Ṣaʿdah city, extending over the town in the west and northwards to the border of the Saudi Jīzān province. To the south, the territory begins about ten to fifteen miles from Ṣaʿdah city and extends to the northwest to the Saudi Arabian border. Neighbours are Bakīlī tribes to the east and south, the Tihāmah to the west, and tribes of the Saudi ʿAsīr federation to the north.

Since conclusion of the 1934 Treaty of Ṭāʾif, which defined the boundary between Yemen's former Mutawakkilite Kingdom and the Kingdom of Saudi Arabia (renewed by the Treaty of Jeddah in 2000), the territory of the federation has been divided by the Yemeni-Saudi border. Five member tribes are located on the Yemeni side: Saḥār, Rāziḥ, Jumāʿah, Munabbih, and Khawlān. Three member tribes are located on the Saudi side in Jīzān province: Banī Mālik, Fayfāʾ, and Balghāzī.

Some individuals of the Khawlan tribes in the Sarawat Mountains still speak their mother tongue, which is an ancient Yemeni language, Himyaritic, which is threatened with extinction. It is where the Khawlani Coffee Beans come from.

=== Khawlan al-Tiyal ===
It is situated in the governorates of Sana'a, Marib, and al-Bayda.

== Mentions of Khawlan Al-Tiyal in Old Books ==
The name "Khawlan" appears in many ancient writings. Among these writings, there is an inscription that speaks of a war during the days of the kings of Saba. The king's name was lost from it, and several words and lines were lost, obscuring the meaning.

The authors of these writings participated in this war, and they returned from it in good health and safety. From the remaining words in the text, it can be understood that the Khawlan tribe had revolted against the king of Saba. The Sabaeans prepared a military campaign against them, defeated Khawlan, and prevailed over them, obtaining abundant spoils. The ruler of Khawlan, it was said that his name was not mentioned in the text, and perhaps it was omitted from writing, and he was referred to as Dhi Khawlan (The one of Khawlan).

During the reign of King Shammar Yahri'sh, a battle took place in Tihamah in a location called "Bish" (Bish Province) in the Jazan Province. The leader of the campaign was an officer with the rank of Mukawwa named "Abu Karb" from the Khawlan tribe. It is mentioned that he fought against the tribes of Banu 'Akk, Sahra, and Hura.

Another military campaign was launched by the Khawlanis under the leadership of another Mukawwa from Khawlan towards Harib in Marib. Then they headed towards the region of Khaywan near Sana'a, then to Wadi Amalih in Sa'dah, and then towards Asir once again.

== Mentions of Khawlan bin Amer in Old Books ==
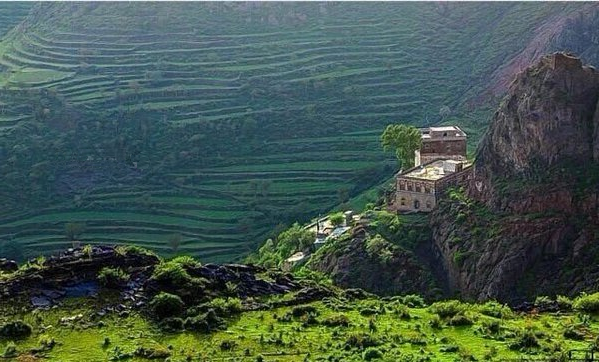
The Razih District in Khawlan bin Amer

After King Shammar returned from his military campaign in Hadhramaut, he launched another campaign against the rebels in Khawlan al-Dadan, the land of the Dadan tribe in the land of Khawlan bin Amer. The King assigned one of his Khawlani officers to camp in the city of Sa'dah (Sabean: 𐩨𐩠𐩴𐩧𐩬 𐩮𐩲𐩵𐩩𐩣, romanized: Bhjrn Sa'datm) and provide protection there. He then proceeded to block the road for some of the Dadan and Sanhan tribes in Wadi Dafa. The military commander carried out what was requested of him. Then King Shammar returned and issued his command to attack Sahartan and Hartan, the land of the Sahra and Hart tribes, where the King had previously launched military campaigns against them. Sanhan still resides in Wadi Dafa to this day, while the Dadan tribe's mention has been discontinued.

== Islamification of Khawlan ==
Upon the emergence of Islam, the Khawlan tribes in Sa'dah and Sana'a were devoted to the pagan deity Ami'anas ibn Sanhan. The Khawlan tribe embraced Islam in the tenth year after the Hijra (migration to Medina). A delegation from the tribe came to the Islamic Prophet Muhammad, declaring their acceptance of Islam. There were ten of them, and they said,

"O Messenger of Allah, we are ahead of our people, and we believe in Allah, the Almighty, and we confirm His Messenger. We have driven our camels to you, and we have traveled the land and its plains, giving thanks to Allah and His Messenger. We have come to visit you." The Islamic Prophet replied, "As for your journey to me, for every step you took, you will receive a reward equivalent to the good deed of riding a camel. As for your statement about visiting me, whoever visits me in Medina will be close to me on the Day of Resurrection." They said, "O Messenger of Allah, this journey is not easy for us." The Messenger of Allah then asked about Ami'anas (the pagan deity). They replied, "Give us glad tidings from Allah in exchange for what we have brought, for there are remnants of our people, an elderly sheikh and an elderly woman, who are holding onto him. If we were to approach him, we would destroy him, Allah willing, for we have been misled and tested by him."

So the Islamic Prophet said to them, "How great was the trial you experienced?" They replied, "Indeed, we suffered greatly until we ate dry grass. We gathered whatever we could and bought a hundred bulls, which we sacrificed to Ami'anas as a gift in one morning. We left them for the wild animals to consume, even though we were in greater need of them than the wild animals. Then, rain came at the time we needed it most, and we saw the grass covering the ground. Our people said, 'Ami'anas has blessed us.' They also told the Islamic Prophet about how they used to divide their livestock and crops for their idol, believing that they were allocating a portion for Ami'anas and a portion for Allah. They said, 'When we planted crops, we would designate a portion for him and call it his, and we would designate another portion for Allah. If the wind blew in one direction, we considered the portion designated for Ami'anas his, but if the wind blew in another direction, we did not consider it for Allah.' The Islamic Prophet then recited to them the verse: 'And they assign to Allah from that which He created of crops and livestock a share...' (Quran 6:136)."

They said, "We used to seek his judgment, and he would speak to us." The Islamic Prophet said, "Those were the devils who were speaking to you." They asked him about the obligations of the religion, so he informed them and commanded them to fulfill their covenants, to uphold trustworthiness, to be good neighbors to those they live among, and not to wrong anyone. The Islamic Prophet then said, "Verily, injustice will be darkness on the Day of Resurrection." Then he bid them farewell after a few days and allowed them to depart. They returned to their people but did not do anything until they destroyed the idol, Ami'anas.

Members of the Khawlan tribes in Sa'dah and the Sarat region (Jazan) are divided into 30 tribes, each with its distinct dialect. The most famous of these dialects are the Fayfa' dialect, the Bani Malik dialect, the Munabbeh dialect, the Razah dialect, and the Bani Juma'ah dialect, Their language is considered very important for translating and understanding some Musnad inscriptions. Their language is also spoken by a portion of the mountain dwellers in Yemen, as well as by some other non-Khawlan tribes in Tihama, Asir, and Jazan.

The Khawlanis actively participated in the Islamic conquests, and Al-Samh ibn Malik al-Khawlani ruled over Al-Andalus.

== Languages of Khawlan ==
The ancient Yemenis spoke the Old South Arabian language. The inscriptions written by the ancient Khawlanis show that they spoke the same language as the Sabaeans and Himyarites. Therefore, the language a minority of Khawlan speak today, or "Modern South Arabian" is considered an evolved language descended from the Old South Arabian language.

== Clothing ==
The traditional costume in the Khawlan bin Amer region consists of a dark blue or white shirt, a black maʿawaz adorned with blue, a wreath, and a jambiya. This attire is similar to the attire worn by the inhabitants of the highlands of Yemen and the attire of the people of Tihama Qahtan. The wreath is made from aromatic plants. The wreath is placed on the head and a metal collar is on the elbow as a form of decoration.

Until the 1950s, members of the Khawlan tribes in Sarawat continued to wear the Sabean attire, which consisted of a ma'awaz, wreath, and a metal collar at the elbow. This attire was common in the Kingdom of Saba, as well as among the Bedouin tribes and ancient kingdoms of Yemen since the 12th century BCE.
