= Ṣǝḥuf ʾǝmni inscription =

The Ṣǝḥuf ʾǝmni inscription (Tigrinya: ጽሑፍ እምኒ, ṣǝḥuf ʾǝmni, 'inscribed stone') is an undeciphered stone inscription located in Qoḥayn in Eritrea. It is listed under no. 183 in the Recueil des inscriptions de l'Éthiopie des périodes pré-axoumites et axoumites, where a transcription of the text is provided.

The Ṣǝḥuf ʾǝmni inscription is written in the South Arabian script. However, its language has not yet been identified, and the contents of the inscription remain unknown. The inscription has not been dated, but it has been suggested that the paleography is reminiscent of inscriptions by Ezana, who reigned in the 4th century CE.

== Documentation ==
The site of the inscription, which is known as "Ṣǝḥuf ʾǝmni" on account of the presence of the inscribed stone, was first described by members of the topographical mission of the Istituto Geografico in Florence in 1897. On 8 June 1898, a transcription of the inscription was carried out by Alonso Maria Tancredi. One year later, on 4 June 1898, Carlo Conti Rossini produced another transcription. In 1946, a photography of the inscription was sent to Conti Rossini and in the following year, he published this in the Rassegna di Studi Etiopici, together with both his own and Tancredi's transcriptions.

== Transcription ==
Transcription of the inscription. A dot denotes an untranscribable letter and / starts a new word.

1. ...]t̊..⸤d̊⸥t.d / mb /̊
2. ...]ʿyʿm..d̠b
3. r̊.. / ⸢ʾ̊⸣ẘk̊ / ymwḥnd̠ʿr̊ /
4. b̊y / kb⸢s̊⸣ / trḫ / tbẘ / yʿyr̊
5. wšḥ / l̊ʿwwšḥ / hd̠ḥm / ḥ⸢b̊⸣
6. š̊bdlbd̠ / hllt / ḥ⸢s̊⸣bw / t⸤b⸥
7. ⸤k̊⸥t⸤q̊⸥w / y / tsn⸢ʾ̊⸣ltq / ⸢y⸣. / wwbw / š.
8. .d̠wnl̊w / hks / tb / tsg̊⸤r⸥b / srʾ / g̊n / ^{^{⸢}_{_{⸤}}}d]
9. .b / šm̊h / ḥsbw / srʾ / twk / šdḫw
10. t̊.ʾ̊šd / dʿmdl / ʿtsʾ / wtʾs̊w / ^{^{⸢}_{_{⸤}}}w|
11. ...]l.l / bbʾl̊ / ʾb.ʾ. (number?) / w⸤b̊⸥ /

Transcription without diacritics.

1. ...t..dt.d / mb /
2. ...ʿyʿm..d̠b
3. r.. / ʾwk / ymwḥnd̠ʿr /
4. by / kbs / trḫ / tbw / yʿyr
5. wšḥ / lʿwwšḥ / hd̠ḥm / ḥb
6. šbdlbd̠ / hllt / ḥsbw / tb
7. ktqw / y / tsnʾltq / y. / wwbw / š.
8. .d̠wnlw / hks / tb / tsgrb / srʾ / gn / d
9. .b / šmh / ḥsbw / srʾ / twk / šdḫw
10. t.ʾšd / dʿmdl / ʿtsʾ / wtʾsw / w
11. ...l.l / bbʾl / ʾb.ʾ. (number?) / wb /

Comments:

Line 3: The sign after the first separator appears to be ' rather than s. The traces of the following w are faintly seen; the k is damaged by the break, but the reading is probable. At the end of the line it seems that there is a separator following it; Captain Tancredi had also copied an r.

Line 4: instead of kbs could also be read as kb.

Line 6: the second letter of the third word could be a ' instead of an s, but see hsbw on line 9.

Line 7: from the third sign we see a middle circle and a small line above; the q reading seems certain. The third word is not sure; could be read as an s.

Line 8: if the second last sign of the first word is an I, it is smaller and straighter than the others. The third letter of the fourth word and the first of the sixth look like a straight / with two oblique strokes; it may be g. The last letter in the line appears to be a d, with the lower point of the triangle missing. The copies confirm this reading.

Line 10: The third letter can be ' or s.

== Physical description ==
The Ṣǝḥuf ʾǝmni inscription is found on a stone block measuring 1,80 x 1,60 m. The stone has been damaged and eleven lines of writing are preserved.

== Language ==
The language of the Ṣǝḥuf ʾǝmni inscription remains unidentified. It is "neither Geʽez nor South Arabian, and does not resemble any known language from the region."
