= Muhammad Hasan Awwad =

Saudi author

- محمد حسن عواد
- Born: 1902; Jeddah
- Died: 1980 (aged 77–78)
- Education: Al-Falah School
- Occupations: Author, thinker, teacher at Al Falah School
- Writing career
- Language: Arabic
- Notable work: Authorised Thoughts

Muhammed Hasan Awwad (1902–1980)(محمد حسن عواد) was an author and thinker from Hejaz who was considered to be one of the leaders of the Saudi Arabian literature and philosophy.

He was born in Jeddah, completed his studies in Al-Falah school, and later on became a teacher in the same school. He died in 1980, aged eighty years old.

Awwad was known for his first book, Authorised Thoughts (1926), revolving around the history of the Arabian peninsuala eventually considered to have caused a revolt.

Furthermore, Awwad was viewed as one of the most significant advocators of modernisation and renovating.

== Career and Notable Works ==
Awwad started writing poetry when he was eleven years old. He published a number of poetical works, including "Authorised Thoughts", which discusses his ideas, and contains which was viewed as excessive criticism towards the condition of poetry, literature, in addition to highly criticising "backwardness", and advocating for change and modernism.

Moreover, Awwad tended to be highly competitive with people who opposed the idea of modernism, and tended to attack ones who were attached to their traditions, where he was known for his "poetical epic" with poet, Hamza Shahata.

Furthermore, he worked as teacher in Al-Falah school, and he was the tutor of several authors including Ahmed Qandil, Mahmoud Aref, and Muhammed Ali Maghribi.

Awwad was also a member of the first literature club made in Jeddah in the beginning of the 1950s, where he was nominated as first president, and tutored most of the members which involved a number of authors and poets.

As part of his advocacy for modernisation, he was known to be the first to call for making education available for women

== List of Publications ==
Authorised Thoughts	The Great Sorcerer
Poetries of Aamas and Atlas	Towards a New Identity

== Reviews ==
Critics and authors have considered that Awwad's book, "Authorised thoughts", as a beginning of change in the literature of Hejaz.

Moreover, they mentioned that Awwad tended to hold on to his opinion despite the amount of criticism he would receive regarding his ideas. However, these critics and authors also pointed out to how Awwad's writing style was "too stingy and offensive" where he could have delivered his ideas in "a much nicer way".

== Quotes ==
أيها المشرف من رأس الهرم!

أيها الناظر من خلف السدم

أيها المحجوب في الغيب الأصم!

هذه الدنيا هبوط وصعود

درج السلم ترتج ارتجاجا،

والمساعي تملأ الأرض عجاجا

ليتها تسلك للخير فجاجا!
