= Shamekh Bluwi =

Jordanian illustrator

Shamekh Bluwi is a Saudi illustrator and fashion designer. He gained worldwide popularity after his published sketches went viral on the Internet. In sketches, the women's dresses' design-line was cut-out so that the background would form texture for the dress. He composed most of this art in his hometown Amman as the background.
