= Manaba =

Manaba may refer to:

- Manaba district, a district of the Sa'dah Governorate, Yemen
- Manaba Beach, a beachside town on the South Coast of the KwaZulu-Natal province of South Africa
