= Nagya Al Rabiea =

Saudi Arabian actress and film director

- Born: 21 December 1955 (age 70); Ta'if, Saudi Arabia
- Occupations: film director, actress
- Years active: 1988 – present

Nagya Al Rabiea (Arabic: ناجية الربیع) is a well-known Saudi Arabian actress and film director. She has participated in more than 100 films and television series.

== Background ==
Nagya AlRabiea was born in 1955 in Ta'if, Saudi Arabia. She graduated from University of San Francisco in 1984 and started her professional acting career in 1988.

== Selected filmography ==
=== Actress ===
- Hubun bila hudud (2018)
- Harat al-shaykh (2016)
- Enty Taleq (2013)
- Riches of Desert 4 - Challenge (2012)
- Min alaakhir (2012)
- Sun shines twice (2010)
- Days of Mirage (2009)
- El-nass Fi Kafar Askar (2003)
- Fares Bela Gawad (2002)
- Tash Ma Tash 4 (1997)
- The liberty apartment (1996)
- Eve and the apple (1996)
- Aswar Alzulm (1995)

=== Director ===
- إللي ماله أول ماله تالي
- عاد ولكن
