= Fifa (disambiguation) =

FIFA, or Fédération Internationale de Football Association, is an international governing body of association football.

Fifa, fifa, or FIFA may also refer to:

== Video games ==
- FIFA (video game series), a series of EA Sports association football video games

== People ==
- Ilias Fifa (born 1989), Moroccan-born Spanish long-distance runner
- Fifa Riccobono, Australian music industry executive

== Places ==
- Fifa Mountains, Saudi Arabia
- Fifa Nature Reserve, Jordan

== Other ==
- Fifă, a Romanian folk wind instrument
- fi. fa., or fieri facias, a type of legal writ
