= Monabbih district =

Coordinates: 17°05′N 43°25′E

Monabbih District
- District
- Interactive map of Monabbih District
- Country: Yemen
- Governorate: Sa'dah

Population (2003)
  - Total: 51,823
- Time zone: UTC+3 (Yemen Standard Time)

Monabbih (Arabic: منبه) is a district of the Sa'dah Governorate, Yemen, as well as the name of the tribe which primarily inhabits its territory. As of 2003, the district had a population of 51,823 inhabitants. The district capital is Sūq al-Khamīs.

== History ==
The first known mention of the Monabbih tribe dates back to the thirteenth century. Due to its remoteness and geographical isolation, Monabbih has long retained a high degree of political and economic autonomy from central state power. This is reflected in the "extreme dialectal peculiarities and special costume" of the titular tribe. Monabbih was traditionally one of two dominant tribes in Razih alongside the rival al-Nazir tribe. During the North Yemen civil war, Monabbih first declared itself neutral and subsequently joined the republican side, making them the only member tribe of the Khawlan bin Amer to do so.

In September and October 2009, during Operation Scorched Earth, the Houthis managed to seize the territory of Monabbih after its fighters had left the barricades to mourn the tribe's recently deceased sheikh.
