= Yāfiʿī Arabic =

Arabic dialect group in Yemen

- Pronunciation: [jaːfiʕiː]
- Native to: Yemen
- Region: Yāfaʿ district
- Ethnicity: Yāfiʿī
- Language family: Afroasiatic: Semitic; West; Central; Arabic; Peninsular; "k-dialects"; Yāfiʿī Arabic
- Dialects: Yiharr; Labʿūs; al-Hedd; al-Mufliḥī

Language codes
- ISO 639-3: –

Yāfiʿī Arabic is a group of closely related Arabic dialects spoken in the Yāfiʿ district of the Lahij governate in Yemen, in the historical territories of the sheikhdoms of Upper (al-ʿUlyā) and Lower (al-Suflā) Yāfiʿ. Unlike most neighboring dialects the varieties of Yāfiʿ belong to the so-called "k-dialect" grouping, meaning that the second person perfect suffixes retain the /-k/ found in the Sayhadic, Afrosemitic, and Modern South Arabian languages as opposed to the /-t/ found in most Arabic dialects. Before the 1990's the dialects of historical Upper and Lower Yāfiʿ had not been described and thus a number if their features that are seen as distinct from neighboring varieties had been overlooked by previous surveys.

== Phonology ==
One of the most notable features of the Yāfiʿī dialects is that the phonemes ġ and q are seemingly in free variation with realizations as /ɣ/, /q/, and /ʁ/ become common in words with both phonemes outside of the village of Jabal Yazīdī. The sound ġ has a fourth realization where primarily older speakers pronounce it as /ʔ/, whilst the younger generation stigmatizes this realization. The village of Jabal Yazid on the other hand has a dialect which merges ġ with the voiced pharyngeal fricative /ʕ/ thus resulting in forms such as /ʕalˤiː/ 'he boiled' (*ɣalaː in Classical Arabic). This sound change is also seen in the neighboring dialects of Daṯīnah and Upper ʿAwlaqī, and in other Semitic languages such as the Modern South Arabian language Soqotri and Pre-Modern Hebrew. In the dialect of al-Mufliḥī and the village of Rusud the voiced pharyngeal fricative /ʕ/ tends to be weakened to a glottal stop primarily in the speech of younger men, resulting in forms such as [ʔəsəni] 'cat' ([ʕusniː] in Yiharr). In al-Mufliḥī the weakening of /ʕ/ to /ʔ/ only occurs word-finally.

Like many other speech varieties in southwestern Arabia the Yāfiʿī dialects maintain a distinction between reflexes of Classical Arabic *ɮˤ and *ðˤ, which are realized as [d̪ˤ] and [ðˤ] respectively.

Alongside neighboring dialect groupings, the dialects of Yāfiʿ monophthongize the Classical Arabic diphthongs *aj and *aw resulting in the long vowels [eː] and [oː] such as in [θoːr] 'bull' and [beːt] 'house'. Similarly the feminine ending *-at experiences imāla of the first degree, meaning that the original /a/ of the ending has become /e/ in these dialects although this seems to be more systematically gender based in the dialect of al-Mufliḥī where male speakers tend to retain the /a/ whilst female speakers have the imāla in their speech.

== Grammar ==
The Yāfiʿī dialects exhibit a rather interesting feature possibly retained from the Sayhadic language Qatabanic, which is the presence of a verbal prefix /b-/ in imperfect verbs, although unlike Qatabanic these prefixes are obligatory unless the verb in question is a verb of modality. While in Yāfiʿī it appears that modality is the exception to the presence of the prefix, the presence or lack thereof of the prefixed *b- in Qatabanic can't be surmised to be due to an opposition in regards to modality. In the dialect of al-Mufliḥī this feature is stigmatized and not usually used by younger speakers, particularly young men who have been educated in school. The variety used in the village of Rusud seems to be characterized by a lack of this feature. In the village of Jabal Yazīdī the future imperfect takes the prefix /ʔaː-/ as opposed to the prefix /bæ-/~/bə-/ used on past and present tense imperfect verbs. A similar phenomenon exists in the Arabic dialects of Syria. The imperfect verb conjugation for the variety of Jabal Yazīdī, a variety of the al-Hedd dialect, is as follows:

[wasˤal] 'to arrive'
		non-future	future
1st	Singular	[bəsˤal]	[ʔaːsˤal]
1st	Plural	[bænsˤal]	[ʔaːnsˤal]
2nd	Masculine singular	[bətˤsˤal]	[ʔaːtˤsˤal]
2nd	Feminine singular	[bætˤsˤaliːn]	[ʔaːtˤsˤaliːn]
2nd	Masculine plural	[bætˤsˤaluːn]	[ʔaːtˤsˤaluːn]
2nd	Feminine plural	[bætˤsˤaleːn]	[ʔaːtˤsˤaleːn]
3rd	Masculine singular	[bæjsˤal]	[ʔaːjsˤal]
3rd	Feminine singular	[bætˤsˤal]	[ʔaːtˤsˤal]
3rd	Masculine plural	[bæysˤaluːn]	[ʔaːjsˤaluːn]
3rd	Feminine plural	[bæjsˤaleːn]	[ʔaːjsˤaleːn]

Most of the Yāfiʿī dialects level the 3rd person feminine suffix *-at to /-ah/, although in the village of Rusud it is more commonly [-ət].
