= Razihi language =

South Semitic language of Yemen

Razihi
- Jabal Razih
- Rāziḥī
- Pronunciation: /lahd͡ʒah raːziħiːt/
- Native to: Yemen
- Native speakers: 62,900 (2004)
- Language family: Afro-Asiatic: Semitic; West Semitic; South Semitic; Southwestern Semitic; Sayhadic; Sabaic?; Razihi
- Writing system: Latin script

Language codes
- ISO 639-3: rzh
- Glottolog: jaba1234
- ELP: Razihi
- Razihi is classified as "definitely endangered" by the UNESCO Atlas of the World's Languages in Danger

Razihi (Rāziḥī), originally known to linguists as "Naẓīri", is a South Semitic language spoken by at least 62,900 people in the vicinity of Mount Razih (Jabal Razih) in the far northwestern corner of Yemen. Along with Faifi and Rijal Alma, it is possibly the only surviving descendant of the Old South Arabian languages.

== Speakers ==
Razihi is spoken on Jabal Razih, a mountain lying west of the town Sa'dah, whose highest summit, Jabal Hurum, is 2,790 m (9,150 ft) high. The population of Jabal Razih was approximately 25,000 in the 1970s and is estimated to be much more now. The number of Razihi speakers is reported by Ethnologue to have been 62,900 in 2004. A comprehensive study of the speakers, including their written tradition, was the topic of the book "A Tribal Order: Politics and Law in the Mountains of Yemen" (2007) by Shelagh Weir. This work includes a number of interesting realities of life in Jabal Razih including the mention that the tribes of the area typically have the term 'Ilt (IPA: /ʔilt/) in their tribe name (e.g. Ilt al-Qayyāl, Ilt ʿIzzan) and that aside from external governing bodies the political sphere of Jabal Razih was typically dominated by the Sayyid elite being that the majority of Razihi tribes have historically been adherents of the Zaydi form of Shi'a Islam. Attestation of the Razih region directly is known as early as al-Hamdani's work al-Iklīl but the tribal federation that the speakers of Razihi belong to, Khawlan bin ʾAmir, were possibly known to the Sabaeans as Ḫwln Gdd(t)n.

Weir makes mention in the beginning of the book that the "local dialect, or language, is extremely unusual, and was always a difficulty, but some male informants could switch to a register of Arabic that I could understand more easily" and this is part of why the plethora of Razihi documents she was able to photocopy required rather specialized knowledge for her to understand. The earliest of these documents date to the early 10th century AH (17th century AD).

Razihi speakers see their speech variety as distinct from those around them who they describe as speaking "Yamanīt" (Yemeni).

== Phonology ==
=== Consonants ===
		Labial	Dental		Alveolar		Postalveolar/ Palatal	Velar	Uvular	Pharyngeal	Glottal
		Labial	plain	phar.	plain	phar.	Postalveolar/ Palatal	Velar	Uvular	Pharyngeal	Glottal
Nasal		m			n						
Plosive/ Affricate	voiceless				t	tˤ	tʃ	k	(q)		ʔ
Plosive/ Affricate	voiced	b			d		dʒ	ɡ			
Fricative	voiceless	f	θ		s	(sˤ)	ʃ	x ~ χ		ħ	h
Fricative	voiced		ð	ðˤ	z			ɣ ~ ʁ		ʕ	
Rhotic					r						
Approximant					l		j	w			

An affricate sound [s͡t] is also present, as a realization of the Arabic [sˤ] from loan words.

- /ʁ/ may also be heard as [ɣ] or as a stop [q] in free variation.
- /dʒ/ may also be heard as a secondary articulated stop [dᶻ].

=== Vowels ===
	Short		Long	
	Front	Back	Front	Back
Close	i	u	iː	uː
Mid			eː	oː
Open	a		aː	

=== Comparison to Arabic ===
Razihi exhibits wide-scale assimilation of coronal consonants in words. Unlike in Arabic, this is not restricted to obstruents but includes sonorants, most significantly /n/, as can be seen in words such as ssān, "man" and ssānah, "woman", which are cognate words of Arabic insān, "person". Nasal consonant assimilation was a feature of some Ancient North Arabian languages (primarily Safaitic) and Old South Arabian but is not found in any Arabic dialect aside from perhaps the speech variety of Harūb, Saudi Arabia.

In contrast to Yemeni Arabic dialects, Razihi does not ever allow word-final consonant clusters (-CC).

Syncope, or the removal, of the high vowels /i/ and /u/ is a common phenomenon in Razihi:

- wāḥdah (IPA: /waːħdah/) – 'one f.' (/waːħid + -ah/)
- wiṣlū (IPA: /wistluː/) – 'they m. arrived' (/wistil + -uː/)
- gibẓūhim (IPA: /gibðˤuːhim/) – 'they m. seized them m.' (/gibiðˤ + -uː- + -him/)

In regards to the realization of the consonants š and ḍ, the suggested realizations in Watson, Glover-Stalls, Al-Razihi, & Weir (2006) are not universally attested and are indeed contested in Behnstedt (1987:94-96), Behnstedt (2017:17), and Weir (2007). The sound š is noted in Behnstedt (1987:94-96) as being "similar to that of Swedish [ʃ]" and that of ḍ being "a retroflexed [t͡ʃ]". The status of the latter is later mentioned again in Behnstedt (2017:17) not as being slightly retroflex but instead being described as such because the tip of the tongue lies just behind the ridge of the teeth when the sound is pronounced. Before mentioning this phonetic quality the discussion begins by questioning how in previous efforts to document the speech variety of Jabal Razih the author was unable to attest the supposed lateral quality of this sound as suggested by Watson, Glover-Stalls, Al-Razih, & Weir (2006), but that it may have been an older realization at some point. Weir (2007:21) notes that the latter sound is pronounced the same as the /t͡ʃ/ in the English word "chat". A similar realization of ḍ as /t͡ʃ/ can be found in the Faifi language. Behnstedt (2017:17) makes note of various words from Razihi with said sound, alongside their Classical Arabic cognates:

- Classical Arabic – *maɮˤaɣa 'to chew' ~ Razihi – /mat͡ʃaɣ/
- Classical Arabic – *ɮˤafʕ 'dung' ~ Razihi – /t͡ʃafaʕ/
- Classical Arabic – *waɮˤaf 'slingshot' ~ Razihi – /wat͡ʃfah/

Other noteworthy features to mention is the realization of ẓ in some words, which seems to have lost both voicing and pharyngealization such as in the word ṯilām (IPA: /θilaːm/) 'darkness', and that of ṣ which is noted in Watson, Glover-Stalls, Al-Razih, & Weir (2005) as being the consonant cluster /st/. The latter may reflect another similarity with Faifi where ṣ is pronounced as the cluster /st/ in loanwords from Arabic but as /sˤ/ in native vocabulary. The phoneme ġ can be realized as /ɣ/, /χ/, or /q/ while the reflex of *q is typically /g/ much like neighboring speech varieties.

Razihi exhibits the monophthongization of *aj and *aw to /eː/ and /oː/ similar to neighboring speech varieties and similar to some suggestive evidence towards this same change in later varieties of Sabaic.

== Pronouns ==
Razihi is unique amongst speech varieties in the area, as far as is documented, for having a rather large inventory of demonstrative pronouns that account for the gender, distance, and whether or not the referent is absent or not. In the proximal demonstratives agreement is restricted to the referent but the distal demonstratives may agree with the addressee. The plural demonstratives have a two-way distinction between human male and non-human male:

demonstrative pronouns of Razihi
			singular		plural	
			male	female	non-human male	male human
Proximal (they/these)			/ðiː/~/ðiːjjah/	/tiː/~/tiːjjah/	/ʔeːliːh/~/ʔeːliːjjah/	/ʔiltiːh/~/ʔiltijjah/
Distal	SG	M addressee	/ðiːħeːk/	/tiːħeːk/	/ʔeːlħeːk/	/ʔiltiːħeːk/
Distal	SG	F addressee	/ðiːħeːt͡ʃ/	/tiːħeːt͡ʃ/	/ʔeːlħeːt͡ʃ/	/ʔiltiːħeːt͡ʃ/
Distal	PL	M addressee	/ðiːħeːkum/	/tiːħeːkum/	/ʔeːlħeːkum/	/ʔiltiːħeːkum/
Distal	PL	F addressee	/ðiːħeːkun/	/tiːħeːkun/	/ʔeːlħeːkun/	/ʔiltiːħeːkun/
Absent/past distal	SG	M addressee	/ðaːk/	/taːk/	/ʔeːlaːk/	/ʔiltaːk/
Absent/past distal	SG	F addressee	/ðaːt͡ʃ/	/taːt͡ʃ/	/ʔeːlaːt͡ʃ/	/ʔiltaːt͡ʃ/
Absent/past distal	PL	M addressee	/ðaːkum/	/taːkum/	/ʔeːlaːkum/	/ʔiltaːkum/
Absent/past distal	PL	F addressee	/ðaːkun/	/taːkun/	/ʔeːlaːkun/	/ʔiltaːkun/

Razihi is unique amongst Semitic languages for having near identical dependent and independent second person pronouns. The independent pronouns of Razihi are as follows:

Razihi independent and dependent pronouns
			Independent	Post-C	Post-V
1st	SG		/ʔaniːh/	/-iːh/~/-niːh/	/-ja/~/-niːh/
1st	PL		/ʔanħaː/	/-(i)naː/	/-naː/
2nd	SG	M	/ʔak/	/-ak/	/-k/
2nd	SG	F	/ʔat͡ʃ/	/-at͡ʃ/	/-t͡ʃ/
2nd	PL	M	/ʔakkum/	/-(i)kum/	/-kum/
2nd	PL	F	/ʔakkun/	/-(i)kun/	/-kun/
3rd	SG	M	/hoːh/	/-oːh/	/-huː/~/-hu/(?)
3rd	SG	F	/heːh/	/-aːh/	/haː/
3rd	PL	M	/him/	/-aːm/~/-jaːm/	/-him/
3rd	PL	F	/hin/	/-oːm/	/-hin/

== Grammatical features ==
Razihi uses a number of prepositions that are reminiscent of Sabaic such as /buː/ 'in' (Sabaic *b- 'in'), /ʔaθar/ 'after' (Sabaic *ʔθr 'after'), /baʕd/ 'after' (Sabaic *bʕd 'after') and /ʕaleː/ 'on' (Sabaic *ʕl 'on, upon') alongside other grammatical features reminiscent of Sabaic such as the usage of /joːm/ as 'when (subordinator)'. This usage of /joːm/ as 'when' can also be found in some Arabic speech varieties such as Tihami Qahtani and various Bedouin varieties in Northeastern Arabia.

Razihi has developed a number of participles through the grammaticalization of a number of classes of content words, such as /rd͡ʒaʕ/ 'then' which was the result of the semantic bleaching of the imperative /ʔird͡ʒaʕ/ 'return (m.s.)!':

- /hijja ʔird͡ʒaʕ ʔiʃbaħ waragit al-ʕagid/ 'Then look at the marriage contact!'

The particle /d͡ʒoː/ is a likely result of the semantic bleaching of the reflex of /d͡ʒaː/ and it primarily functions to convey permanent existence or habitude:

- /maː kaːn d͡ʒoː beː ʃiː braːk wi-hiːh/ 'Weren't there any water cisterns at all?'

Razihi similar to neighboring Arabic speech varieties and Sabaic, but dissimilar to Faifi, retains the so-called "k-perfect". The following is the perfect and imperfect paradigms for the verb /reː/ 'see':

			Perfect	Imperfect
1st person	singular		/roːk/	/ʔaraː/
1st person	plural		/reːnaː/	/niraː/
2nd person	singular	M	/reːk/	/tiraː/
2nd person	singular	F	/reːt͡ʃ/	/tireː/
2nd person	plural	M	/reːkum/	/tiroː/
2nd person	plural	F	/reːkun/	/tireːn/
3rd person	singular	M	/reː/	/jiraː/
3rd person	singular	F	/rajja/	/tiraː/
3rd person	plural	M	/rajjuː/	/jiroː/
3rd person	plural	F	/reːn/	/jireːn/

Similar to Sabaic, Modern South Arabian, and Afrosemitic languages the feminine ending /-t/ is always attested in the definitive and construct states but also in the absolute state in many basic nouns. In adjectives the feminine gender is handled three ways: it is not explicitly marked on verbal participles; in some non-participle adjectives it is marked with a final /-ah/; and in other non-adjective participles by final /-iːt/ in all three states.

The future particle /meːd/ in Razihit functions similarly to that of the speech variety of Rijāl Almaʿ and various Modern South Arabian languages, but unlike either it takes the definitive article /ʔan-/ and is followed by either a verb, noun, or adjective:

- /laː mani m-meːd ʔaɣid baðˤaʕah/ 'No, I don't want to go to Baẓaʿah.'

The continuous aspect is expressed in Razihi is expressed through the /faː/, /fa/, /haː/ +active participle:

- /ðiː kaːnit͡ʃ faː-haːbillaː-h ʔist-stubiħ/ 'The one (f) you were telling this morning'

A similar construction is found in Sabaic in the form of subject + *f- + predicate.
