= Rijal Alma language =

Speech variety of Saudi Arabia

Rijāl Almaʿ
- Riǧāl Almaʿ
- Pronunciation: [rid͡ʒaːl ʔalmaʕ]
- Native to: Saudi Arabia
- Region: Asir
- Native speakers: 100,000 (2009)
- Language family: Afro-Asiatic: Semitic; West Semitic; South Semitic?; Western?; Sayhadic?; Sabaic?; Rijāl Almaʿ

Language codes
- ISO 639-3: –
- Glottolog: hija1235 (covered by Hijazi Arabic)

Rijāl Almaʿ is a speech variety of questionable genetic affiliation spoken in the area in and around the village after which it is named, Rijāl Almaʿ. Amongst the features that make this speech variety so distinctive in the area where it is spoken is the seemingly preserved demonstrative pronominal paradigm from the Sayhadic languages and the presence of the a nasal definite article similar to the proposed modern Sayhadic languages Faifi and Razihi. The speech variety is seemingly gradually being phased out due to increased language convergence with neighboring varieties of Arabic, further complicating the situation regarding where this speech variety belongs within Semitic.

== Speakers ==
The speakers of Rijāl Almaʿ are a rather unique presence in Asir given their historical autonomy both on cultural and political terms, which resulted in a more complicated relationship between them and the Saudi state. Matters of tribal law and customs are handled by the tribal leaders themselves and not the Saudi authorities, leading some to describe it somewhat as a "tribal reservation". The speakers of Rijāl Almaʿ are seemingly mocked for their way of speech and thus this is fueling language change amongst younger speakers, amongst other factors. Rijāl Almaʿ historically remained economically and politically independent from neighboring areas, but upon the discovery of oil and modernization of Saudi Arabia remaining in Rijāl Almaʿ became a matter of lack of opportunities. The modern village of Rijāl Almaʿ is a popular tourist destination in Saudi Arabia and is a tentative UNESCO world heritage site.

== Classification ==
The speech variety of Rijāl Almaʿ was first described as an Arabic variety although since then this classification has been called into question, with al-Jallad (2014:239) noting:

"The Riǧāl Almaʿ dialect, for instance, has generated much excitement on account of its being the only ‘Arabic dialect’ to preserve gender and number agreement in the relative pronoun. But considering our discussion, on what basis can one even call it an Arabic dialect? The ‘preserved’ relative series is in fact a Sabaic isogloss, and other features point equally away from Arabic."

Similar to Razihi and Faifi the speech variety of Rijāl Almaʿ has various lexical and grammatical elements that are not attested in the Sayhadic languages of antiquity but are known to be present in the Modern South Arabian languages of Oman and Yemen. The description of Rijāl Almaʿ as an Arabic dialect may indeed be a default assumption given the area where it is spoken, but its actual place within Semitic remains unclear although the descriptions would suggest a relationship with the Sayhadic languages. A suggestion by Jan Retsö may best explain the situation in Rijāl Almaʿ:

"Apart from Mehri and its sisters there are probably "dialects" in Yemen whose "Arabness" could be disputed. The conclusion is thus that e.g. the kaškaša, k-perfects and other features in the south-western Arabic dialects are not borrowings. Instead, all other elements connecting them with other Arabic dialects are borrowings."

== Grammatical features ==
While a grammatical survey of Rijāl Almaʿ does exist, it remains unpublished and thus the majority of available information on the speech variety comes from two papers by the same author. The most well known feature of Rijāl Almaʿ is its pronominal canon, with the demonstrative and relative pronouns garnering the most attention given that they seem to be inherited not from Arabic but instead a Sayhadic language, presumably Late Sabaic.

The demonstrative pronouns of Rijāl Almaʿ are remarkable in that they are most similar to the forms found in Late Sabaic, with the pronoun [ma] being unique to Rijāl Almaʿ. Sabaic does not have a demonstrative or relative pronoun for the non-human plural. Razihi does something similar in that it distinguishes the feminine human and non-human plural from the masculine plural in relative and demonstrative pronouns.

- [ð-] is the base for the masculine singular relative and demonstrative pronouns [ðiːh] 'this', [ðahnah] 'that', and [ða] (rel.).
- [t-] is the base for the feminine singular relative and demonstrative pronouns [tiːh] 'this', [tahnah] 'that', and [ta] (rel.).
- [wul-] is the base for the human plural relative and demonstrative pronouns [wuliːh] 'this', [wulahnah] 'that', [wulaːx̟] 'that' and [wula] (rel.).
- [m-] is the base for the non-human plural relative and demonstrative pronouns [mahniːh] 'this', [mahnah] 'that', and [ma] (rel.).

Exceptionally, in relative clauses with a definite antecedent the number and gender of the relative pronoun must be in agreement while when there is an indefinite antecedent there is no relative pronoun at all, although the verb must be in agreement with the antecedent:

- Definite antecedent — [gaːbalt ʔim-brat ta lisa jasmaʕ] 'I met the girl who couldn't hear'
- Indefinite antecedent — [ʔana rajt ʔibratin ʃaradan] 'I saw the girl running away'

Unfortunately this pronominal paradigm is being replaced by the more common colloquial Arabic forms in both the demonstrative and relative pronouns, such as the forms [ðolaːk] 'that' and [ðoːlih] 'this' found in Behnstedt (2017). These borrowed forms are similar to those found in the Arabic dialect of Abha, which has a forms normative to both Arabic and those similar to Sayhadic languages.

Unlike other speech varieties in the area the nominal endings in Rijāl Almaʿ vary based upon whether they occur in pausal position, the gender of the noun, the definiteness, and the grammatical number. Notably this includes the indefinite marking known as tanwīn in Arabic studies, otherwise known as nunation in Semitic linguistics. Much like in the speech varieties if the Jizan mountains and Northwestern Yemen Rijāl Almaʿ exhibits a distinction between pausal and non-pausal forms for indefinite marking:

- /-in/ for singular and plural masculine nouns outside of pause, /-u/ in pause.
- /-tin/ for singular feminine nouns outside of pause, unmarked in pause.
- /-aːtin/ for plural feminine nouns outside of pause, unmarked in pause.

This differs substantially from so-called "dialectal tanwīn" in most Arabic dialects, and from that of the Faifi language where there is no recorded distinction made for feminine nouns and the indefinite marking has been generalized to /-in/ on all nouns regardless of gender or number. The Arabic varieties of al-Farsha and Bilad Bal-Qarn, and the speech variety of Bani Abadil, Yemen seem to also share this peculiarity in indefinite marking differing only in their lack of forms for feminine nouns.
