= Faifi language =

Possible descendant of Ancient South Arabian

Faifi
- ʾal-lahja ʾal-Fayfiya, Ḫawlāniya
- Pronunciation: /həɾʒət ʔahɪl fəjfə/
- Native to: Saudi Arabia, Yemen
- Region: Jebel Fayfa, Jebel Minabbih
- Native speakers: 50,000 (2009)
- Language family: Afro-Asiatic: Semitic; West Semitic; South Semitic?; Southwestern?; Sayhadic?; Faifi
- Writing system: Latin script

Language codes
- ISO 639-3: fif
- Glottolog: faif1234

Faifi is a possible descendant of Ancient South Arabian and is spoken by about 50,000 people in the vicinity of the Fifa Mountains in the southwestern corner of Saudi Arabia and across the border in Jebel Minabbih, Yemen. Along with the Razihi and Rijal Alma languages, it is possibly the only other surviving descendant of the Ancient South Arabian branch of South Semitic.

== Speakers ==
Faifi is spoken in an area of roughly 600 km² (232 m²) along the Saudi border known as Jabal Fayfa by some estimated 50,000 people primarily living in the upper part of the mountains. Until 35 years ago no major roads entered Jabal Fayfa and almost everyone is bilingual while younger generations are less immersed in the language than to varieties of Saudi dialects such as Hejazi, Nejdi, and Standard Arabic alongside their own language due to prolonged contact with Arabic language media, education, etc. Education in Jabal Fayfa tends to be bilingual. Many Faifi-speakers leave Jabal Fayfa for educational and work related prospects and thus it is speculated they normally do not transmit their language to their children born outside of the native speech area. Because of such it is suggested that Faifi is an endangered language. Many speakers will switch to known varieties of Arabic to communicate with people outside of Fayfa.

Faifi-speakers have historically enjoyed a sustained degree of independence due to the terrain they inhabit, similar to the peoples of Jabal Minabbih across the border, and thus many of the effects of modernity were experienced later in the region. Much like the peoples of Jabal Razih the peoples of Jabal Fayfa belong to the Ḫawlan bin ʾAmir parent-tribe hence why Ḫawlāniya (IPA: /xawlaːnija/) has become a popular colloquial name for Faifi and neighboring speech varieties.

== Classification ==
The classification of Faifi is a topic of great interest since it was first considered to not be a dialect of Arabic. While most discussions of the language cover only the speech variety found in Jebel Fayfa, it has been suggested that the speech variety across the border in Jabal Minabbih is the same language and this would mean that Faifi is spoken on both sides of the Saudi-Yemeni border and encompasses more than just the speech varieties which are the most well documented. In the ISO change request regarding the language it was noted by linguist Michael Ahland himself said that he was "completely convinced that Faifi is an independent language" but did not know what language it could possibly be a dialect of given that it is exceedingly unlike the neighboring Arabic speech varieties. The discussion of Faifi as a Sayhadic language is not well studied, and although plausible it is fair to stay on the side of caution given that no definitive comparative study has been conducted between Faifi and any known Sayhadic language, including neighboring Razihit. An air of caution can be found in Lowry (2020) when Faifi is discussed, noting that while some authors jump to claim Faifi as a descendant of a Sayhadic language (more broadly "Himyaritic") Watson (2018) does make the argument that Faifi and Razihit both may be amongst numerous speech varieties in this area that could be holdouts of this long assumed to be extinct branch of Central Semitic.

== Phonology ==
The consonant inventory of Faifi is as follows according to both Alfaifi & Behnstedt (2010), Alfaife (2018) and Alaslani (2017); allophones are in parentheses and phonemes attested only in Alaslani (2017) are in brackets:

		Labial	Dental		Alveolar		Post- alveolar	Palatal	Velar	Uvular	Pharyngeal	Glottal
		Labial	plain	emphatic	plain	emphatic	Post- alveolar	Palatal	Velar	Uvular	Pharyngeal	Glottal
Plosive	voiceless				t	tˤ			k			ʔ
Plosive	voiced	b			d		[ɖ]		g			
Affricate	voiceless				(t͡s)^{2}		t͡ʃ					
Affricate	voiced						(d͡ʒ)^{4}					
Fricative	voiceless	f	θ	θˤ	s	sˤ (st)^{5}	ʃ^{3}		x	[χ]	ħ	h
Fricative	voiced		ð	(ðˤ)^{1}	z		ʒ		[ɣ]	ʁ	ʕ	
Rhotic					ɾ [r]							
Nasal		m			n							
Approximant	lateral				l		[ɭ]					
Approximant	central	w						j				

Some important features regarding consonant inventory of Faifi include:

1. The phoneme /ðˤ/ is attested in both the Upper and Lower dialects as a variant of [θˤ] and is suspected to be a byproduct of contact with Arabic. In the Upper variety of Faifi the phoneme is typically pronounced as /f/ or /θ/ while both the pharyngealization and place of articulation is preserved in the Lower dialect and in Minnabih.
2. The phoneme /t͡s/ appears to be a variation of the phoneme [t͡ʃ] in the Upper dialect although it can vary between speakers; it is [t͡ʃ] in both Minabbih and the Lower dialect. The phoneme [t͡ʃ] is a reflex of both historical *k and *ɮˤ in both areas, similar to Razihi.
3. Alfaifi & Behnstedt (2010) describes the phoneme /ʃ/ as apical-alveolar in the Lower dialect and apical-palatal in the Upper dialect, while in Minabbih it is pronounced as [ç] by some speakers. Behnstedt originally described it as a sound similar to a retroflexed ich-Laut, which he later clarifies as incorrect.
4. The phoneme /d͡ʒ/ is a dialectal variation of [ʒ].
5. Faifi is well known for having the segment /st/ as a reflex of historical *sˤ in environments where the phoneme is not restricted from this change. While Behnstedt & Alfaifi (2010) assume that this reflex is evidence towards an earlier affricate *t͡sˤ a more recent thesis, Alfaifi (2022), claims that in the Central dialect of Faifi it is demonstrable that this reflex is bisegmental and hence may be the result of a loss of emphasis.

The vowel phonemes of Upper Faifi per Alfaife (2018) are as follows:

	Short			Long		
	Front	Central	Back	Front	Central	Back
Close	i		u	iː		(uː)
Mid				eː		
Open		a			aː	
Diphthong	aj aw					

Some important features regarding the vowel phonemes of Upper Faifi include:

1. The phonemes /i/, /a/, /u/ become [ɪ], [ə], [ʊ] in closed syllables with the schwa being present as well at the end of words if there is an absolute pause, otherwise the /a/ is maintained.
2. The status of the long vowel /uː/ is unclear being that it is not reported to be phonemically contrastive with /u/; the phoneme can only appear in the first open syllable of a word in a closed syllable word medially.
3. In contrast to Razihi, Faifi in all of its varieties maintains the diphthongs /aj/ and /aw/ but has a tendency towards monophthongization such as in the words /t͡ʃeːf/ 'how?' (Minabbih) and /θoːbin/ 'gown' (Faifi).
