= Fayfa Mountains =

Mountains in Saudi Arabia

- Location within Saudi Arabia Location within Middle East Location within Asia

Highest point
- Elevation: 1,428 metres (4,685 ft)

Naming
- Native name: Jibāl Fayfāʾ (Arabic); جِبَالُ فَيْفَاءَ (Arabic)

Geography
- Location: Jazan Province, Saudi Arabia
- Region(s): South Arabia, Middle East, Asia
- Range coordinates: 17°15′N 43°06′E

The Fayfa Mountains or Faifa Mountains (Arabic: جِبَالُ فَيْفَاءَ, romanized: Jibāl Fayfāʾ) are located in the vicinity of the town of Fayfa in Jazan Province, southwest Saudi Arabia.

== Description ==
They are as high as 7,000 ft (2,100 m) and they cover an area of almost 600 km^{2} (230 sq mi). This group of mountains constitutes a part of the Sarawat range, which is generally considered to be divided into two subranges within western Saudi Arabia: the Hijaz Mountains in the north (towards the Levant) and the 'Asir Mountains in the south (towards Yemen). Unlike many other mountains in Saudi Arabia, the temperature of Fayfa mountains is generally moderate. The jagged rock formations are covered with green flora and have many agricultural terraces. The various fields scattered around the mountains are known for their very high peaks and green terraces. Moreover, the most famous crops planted in the fields are coffee and maize. The mountains twist around each other. Thus, from a distance, the mountains appear as one pyramid-shaped mountain.

== Fayfa' ==
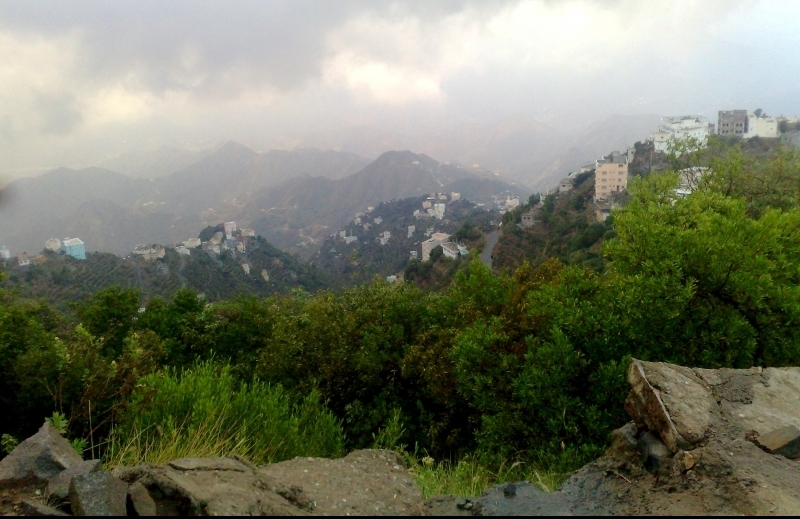

The area of the mountain is inhabited by 20 tribes. The men of those tribes used to wear floral outfits, silver belts and colorful hair bands. They have their own traditional language, songs, poetry and tales.

=== Jizan Museum ===
The largest museum of Jizan is located in a castle in the mountains. It has a large number of weapons and bandoliers, ropes, carriage bags, tools, fire lanterns.

== See also ==
- Mountains in the Arabian Peninsula
  - List of mountains in Saudi Arabia
