= Saudis =

People of Saudi Arabia

Saudis سعوديُّون
- Map of Saudis in The World

Total population
- c. 22,000,000

Regions with significant populations
- Saudi Arabia 20,080,000
- Egypt: 600,000
- United States: 167,511
- Kuwait: 440,773
- United Arab Emirates: 100,247
- Lebanon: 21,842
- United Kingdom: 102,604
- Australia: 41,900
- Turkey: 30,878
- Jordan: 86,622
- France: 84,000
- Qatar: 83,560
- Iran: 12,314
- Canada: 80,000
- Malaysia: 72,000
- Brazil: 45,000
- Libya: 8,000
- Germany: 35,000
- Palestine: 2,000
- India: 4,000
- Sweden: 7,406
- Bahrain: 5,000
- Algeria: 4,000
- Netherlands: 3,000
- Oman: 2,000
- Indonesia: 2,000
- New Zealand: 2,000
- Mali: 2,000
- Venezuela: 2,000
- Sri Lanka: 1,417
- Norway: 1,223
- Iraq: 1,000
- Spain: 1,000
- Italy: 1,000
- Switzerland: 1,000
- Belgium: 1,000
- Austria: 1,000
- Senegal: 1,000
- Philippines: 621
- Finland: 599
- Colombia: 74
- Russia: 12
- Taiwan: 3

Languages
- Arabic (Bahrani, Bareqi, Gulf, Hejazi, Najdi, Rijal Almaa dialect, Tihami), Faifi language

Religion
- Islam

Related ethnic groups
- other Arabs, Semites and Afroasiates

Saudis (Arabic: سعوديُّون, romanized: suʿūdiyyūn; local dialects: سعوديين, suʿūdiyyīn) or Saudi Arabians are the citizen population of the Kingdom of Saudi Arabia, who speak the Arabic language, a Central Semitic language, and share a common ancestry, history, and culture. Saudi Arabians are mainly composed of tribal Arabs and live in the five historical Regions: Najd, Hejaz, Asir, Tihamah and Al-Ahsa; the regions which the Kingdom of Saudi Arabia was founded on or what was formerly known as the Kingdom of Hejaz and Nejd in the Arabian Peninsula. Saudis speak one of the dialects of Peninsular Arabic, including the Hejazi, Najdi, Gulf and Southern dialects (e.g. Bareqi, Faifi) as a mother tongue.

== Culture ==
The culture of Saudi Arabia is deeply rooted in Arab traditions and Islamic values. It is generally conservative, religious, traditional, and family-oriented. For example, alcoholic beverages are prohibited, though some social and cultural restrictions have begun to ease in recent years.

Daily life is strongly influenced by Islamic practices and laws. Even non-Muslim residents are expected to respect Islamic customs, including dress codes that meet certain modesty standards. Muslims are called to prayer five times daily from the minarets of mosques across the country. Since Friday is the holiest day in Islam, the weekend is observed on Friday and Saturday.

In accordance with Salafi doctrine, only two religious holidays, Eid al-Fitr and Eid al-Adha, were officially recognized until 2006. That year, a secular national holiday—September 23—commemorating the unification of the kingdom, was reintroduced and became widely celebrated.

== Social life and customs ==
=== Urban ===
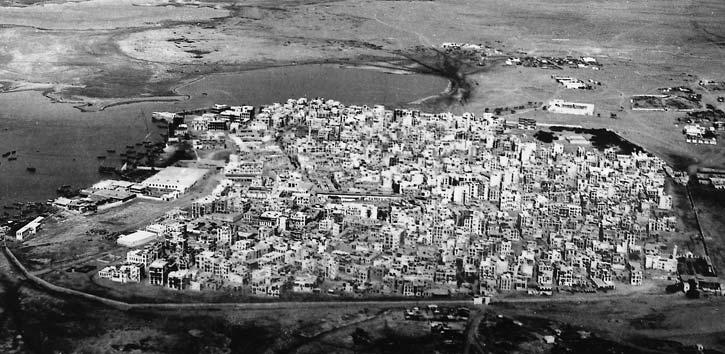
Urban center of Jeddah in the 20th century (1938)

The original inhabitants of cities and villages are known as (Arabic: حَضَر, romanized: ḥaḍar) sedentary people; they settled in villages, towns and cities across Saudi Arabia. Some of the famous cities of the past and some still remain were Al-Ahsa, Qaryat al-Faw, Dumat al-Jandal, Al-Ukhdud, Al-Ula, Diriyah, Ha'il, Jeddah, Manfouha, Mecca, Medina, Qatif, Madain Saleh, Tabuk, Taif, Tarout island, Tayma, and Thaj.

Most Saudis (whether they were historically sedentary or nomadic) trace their lineage to the different tribes of Arabia, and there are also many prominent Saudis of various origins including Caucasian, Bosniak (e.g. Deputy Minister at Ministry of Tourism; Mohammed Bushnag), Southeast Asian (Jawi) (e.g. former minister of Hajj and Umrah; Muhammad Benten), Turkish (e.g. Dr. Muhammad Khashoggi), Central Asian (Bukhari) (e.g. footballer; Amin Bukhari) and South Asian (e.g. footballer; Abdulbasit Hindi). They are mostly from the cities of Mecca, Medina and Jeddah in the Hejaz region.

==== Afro-Saudi ====
Many Afro-Saudis belong to tribes that trace their heritage to the Hausa people and also to historical Tekrur and Ghana empire, this is evident in family names such as Hawsawi (e.g. footballer; Osama Hawsawi), Fallatah, and Bernawi. A number of members of the Afro-Saudi minority are descendants of former slaves, in particular descendants of the slaves who had been freed in 1962. Afro-Saudi activists complain that they are not given media representation and are unable to find opportunities to improve their social condition. Many suffer from racial discrimination in employment and education. Many Saudis view them as inferior.

=== Bedouins ===
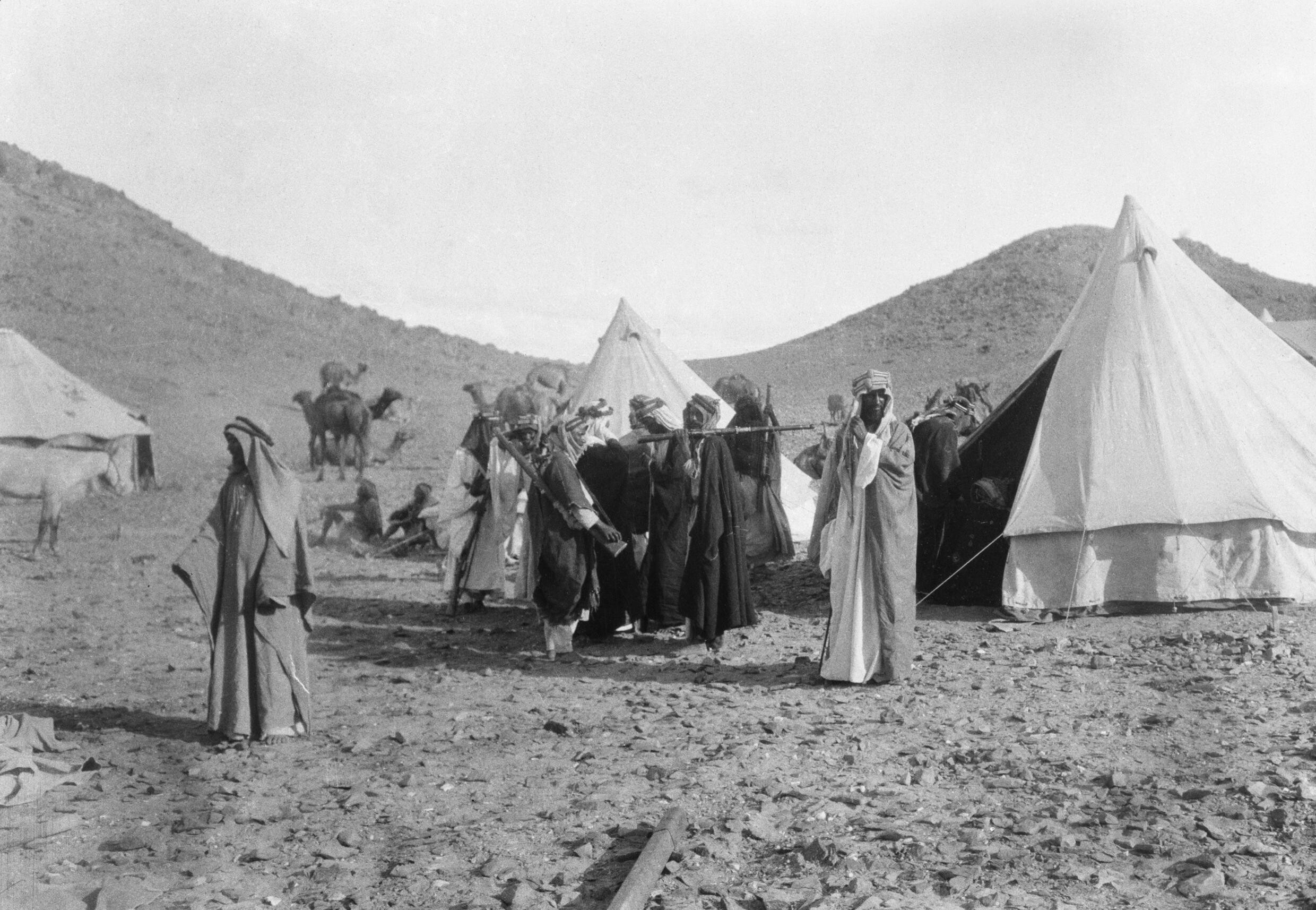
A 20th century photograph from the Hejaz (Bedouins).

A portion of the original inhabitants of the area that is now Saudi were known as Bedouin (nomads) (Arabic: بَدُو, romanized: badu). They remain a significant and very influential component of the indigenous Saudi population, though many who call themselves "badu" (nomad) no longer engage in "traditional tribal activities" and are instead settled. According to authors Harvey Tripp and Peter North, the Bedouin make up most of the judiciary, religious leaders, and National Guard (which protects the throne) of the country. Bedouin culture is "actively" preserved by the government. Nowadays, most bedouins have been urbanized, living in towns or cities, but they still designate themselves as nomads and speak bedouin dialects as opposed to the dialects of the sedentary tribes or urban centers.

=== Greetings ===
Greetings in Saudi Arabia have been called "formal and proscribed" and lengthy. Saudis (specifically men) tend "to take their time and converse for a bit when meeting". Inquiries "about health and family" are customary, but never about a man's wife, as this "is considered disrespectful."

=== Dress ===
The religion and customs of Saudi Arabia dictate not only conservative dress for men and women, but a uniformity of dress unique to most of West Asia. Traditionally, the different regions of Saudi have had different dress, but since the re-establishment of Saudi rule these have been reserved for festive occasions, and "altered if not entirely displaced" by the dress of the homeland of their rulers (i.e. Najd).

In Saudi Arabia, women were required to cover in public. However, in March 2018, the Crown Prince Mohammad bin Salman claimed that women could choose what to wear in public, provided it met certain standards, when he stated, "The decision is entirely left for women to decide what type of decent and respectful attire she chooses to wear". Until late 2019, all women were required to wear an abaya, a long cloak that covers all but the hands, hair, and face in public. Modest dress is compulsory for women in Islam, but the color black for women and white for men is apparently based on tradition not religious scripture. Foreign women were required to wear an abaya, but did not need to cover their hair. Many Saudi women also normally wear a full face veil, such as a niqāb. Women's clothes are often decorated with tribal motifs, coins, sequins, metallic thread, and appliqués.

In recent years it is common to wear Western dress underneath the abaya. Foreign women in Saudi Arabia are "encouraged" by the religious police to wear an abaya, or at least cover their hair, according to the New York Times. Authors Harvey Tripp and Peter North encourage women to wear an abaya in "more conservative" areas of the kingdom, i.e. in the interior.

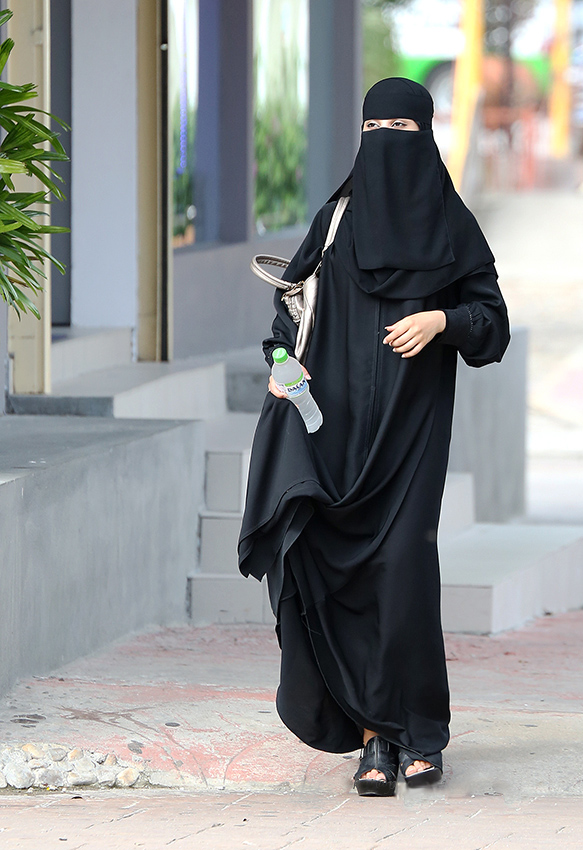
Saudi woman wearing a niqāb in Riyadh.

Saudi men and boys, whatever their job or social status, wear the traditional dress called a thobe or thawb, which has been called the "Arabic dress". During warm and hot weather, Saudi men and boys wear white thobes. During the cool weather, wool thobes in dark colors are not uncommon. At special times, men often wear a bisht or mishlah over the thobe. These are long white, brown or black cloaks trimmed in gold. A man's headdress consists of three things: the tagia, a small white cap that keeps the gutra from slipping off the head; the gutra itself, which is a large square of cloth; and the igal, a doubled black cord that holds the gutra in place. Not wearing an igal is considered a sign of piety. The gutra is usually made of cotton and traditionally is either all white or a red and white checked. The gutra is worn folded into a triangle and centred on the head.

- Ghutrah (Arabic: غترة pronounced [ɣʊtra]) is a traditional keffiyeh headdress worn by men in the Arabian peninsula. It is made of a square of usually finer cotton cloth ("scarf"), folded and wrapped in various styles (usually a triangle) around the head. It is commonly worn in areas with an arid climate, to provide protection from direct sun exposure, and also protection of the mouth and eyes from blown dust and sand.
- Agal (Arabic: عقال pronounced [ʕɪɡaːl]) is an item of Arab headgear constructed of cord which is fastened around the keffiyeh to hold it in place. The agal is usually black in colour.
- Abaya (Arabic: عباية pronounced [ʕabaːja]) is a women's hijab worn by women when leaving the house. It is a black cloak that covers the entire body except for the head, although some abayas also cover the top of the head.
- Imama (Arabic: عمامة pronounced [ʕɪmaːma]) is a type of the turban headdress native to the region of Hejaz in modern-day western Saudi Arabia; it is but one version of Arabian turbans that have been worn in the Arabian Peninsula from the pre-Islamic era to the present day, but in general nowadays most Hejazis wear Shumagh (Arabic: شُماغ pronounced [ʃʊmaːɣ]) instead.
- Thawb (Arabic: ثوب pronounced [θo̞ːb, t-]) is the standard Arabic word for garment. It is ankle length, woven from wool or cotton, usually with long sleeves similar to a robe.
- Bisht (Arabic: بشت pronounced [bɪʃt]) is a traditional long, white, brown or black Arabic cloak trimmed in gold worn by men. It is usually only worn for prestige on special occasions such as weddings, or in chilly weather.

More recently, Western dress, particularly T-shirts and jeans have become quite common leisurewear, particularly in Jeddah, Riyadh and the Eastern Province. Traditional footwear is leather sandals but most footwear is now imported.

== Religion ==
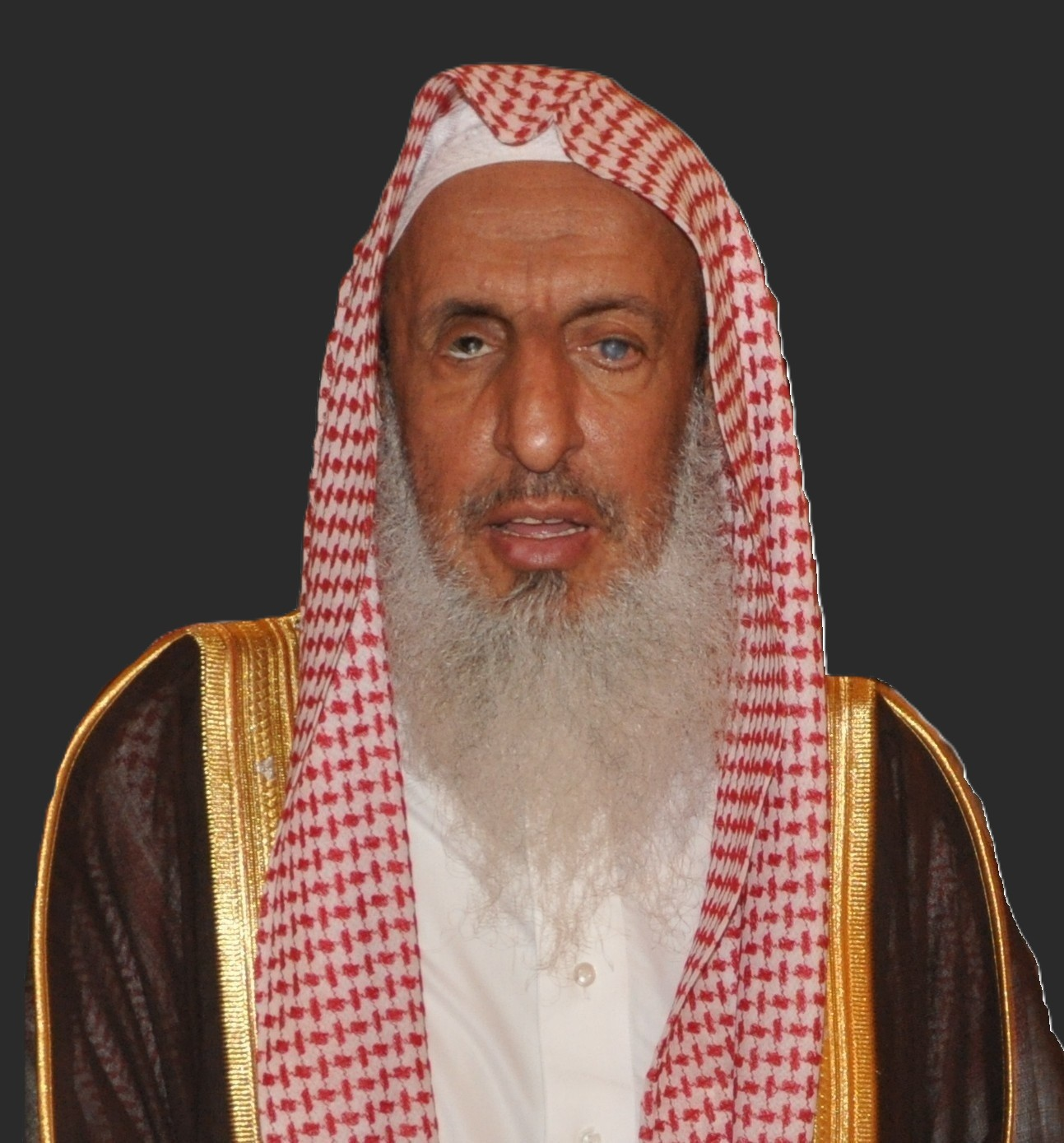
Abdulaziz Al al-Sheikh, Grand Mufti of Saudi Arabia from 1999 to 2025.

Islam is the state religion of Saudi Arabia and its law requires that all citizens be Muslims. The government does not legally protect the freedom of religion. Any overseas national attempting to acquire Saudi nationality must convert to Islam. Saudi Arabia has been criticized for its implementation of Islamic law and its poor human rights record.

=== Islam ===
The official form of Islam is the Wahhabi version of Sunni Islam. According to official statistics, 90% of Saudi citizens are Sunni Muslims, and 10% Shia. More than 30% of the population is made up of foreign workers who are predominantly but not entirely Muslim. It is unknown how many Ahmadi there are in the country. The two holiest cities of Islam, Mecca and Medina, are in Saudi Arabia. For many reasons, non-Muslims are not permitted to enter the holy cities although some Western non-Muslims have been able to enter, disguised as Muslims.

=== Non-Muslims ===
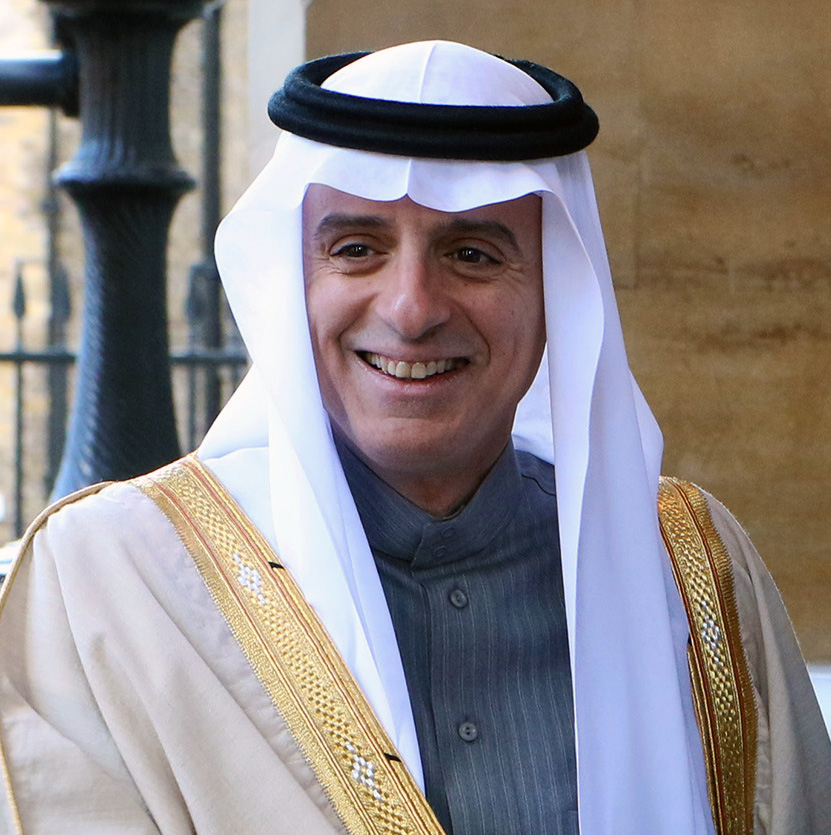
Adel al-Jubeir, Minister of the Kingdom of Saudi Arabia for Foreign Affairs.

The large number of foreign workers living in Saudi Arabia (7.5 million expatriates in 2013) includes non-Muslims.

==== Policy of exclusion ====
According to scholar Bernard Lewis, the Saudi policy of excluding non-Muslims from permanent residence in the country is a continuation of an old and widely accepted Muslim policy. While Saudi Arabia does allow non-Muslims to live in Saudi Arabia to work or do business, they may not practice religion publicly. According to the government of the United Kingdom:

The public practice of any form of religion other than Islam is illegal; as is an intention to convert others. However, the Saudi authorities accept the private practice of religions other than Islam, and you can bring a Bible into the country as long as it is for your personal use. Importing larger quantities than this can carry severe penalties.

Saudi Arabia still gives citizenship to people from other countries.

== Census ==
The first official population census of Saudi Arabia was in 1974. It had 6,218,361 Saudi nationals and 791,105 non-nationals for a total of 7,009,466. Of those, 5,147,056 people were settled and the number of nomads recorded were 1.86 million.

Until the 1960s, much of the population was nomadic or seminomadic; due to rapid economic and urban growth, more than 95% of the population now is settled. 80% of Saudis live in three major urban centers—Riyadh, Jeddah, or Dammam. Some cities and oases have densities of more than 1,000 people per square kilometer (2,600 people/mi^{2}). Despite the rapid growth in Saudi Arabia over the past decades, it is experiencing a rapid decline not only in mortality, followed by fertility rates, which fell from about seven children on average per woman in the last century to 2.4 in 2016, based on the latest population survey conducted by the General Authority for Statistics. Saudi Arabia has lagged far behind in increasing its population compared to its neighbors, such as Iraq and Syria.

According to the 2022 census, Saudi nationals represented approximately 18,800,000 making up 58.4% of the total population of Saudi Arabia.

== Genetics ==
DNA tests of Y chromosomes from representative sample of Saudis have been analyzed for composition and frequencies of haplogroups: a plurality (71.02%) belong to haplogroup J1-M267. Other frequent haplogroups include haplogroup J2-M172 (2.68%), A (0.83%), B (1.67%), E1b1a (1.50%), E1b1b (11.05%), G (1.34%), H (0.33%), L (1.00%), Q (1.34%), R1a (2.34%), R1b (0.83%), T (2.51%), and P (1.50%).

== See also ==
- Arabs
- Arab League
- Bidoon

== Bibliography ==
Lewis, Bernard (November–December 1998). "License to Kill: Usama bin Ladin's Declaration of Jihad". Foreign Affairs. 77 (6): 14–19. doi:10.2307/20049126. JSTOR 20049126. Archived from the original on 28 April 2015.
