= Sabaic =

Ṣayhadic language spoken in Yemen

- Sabaean
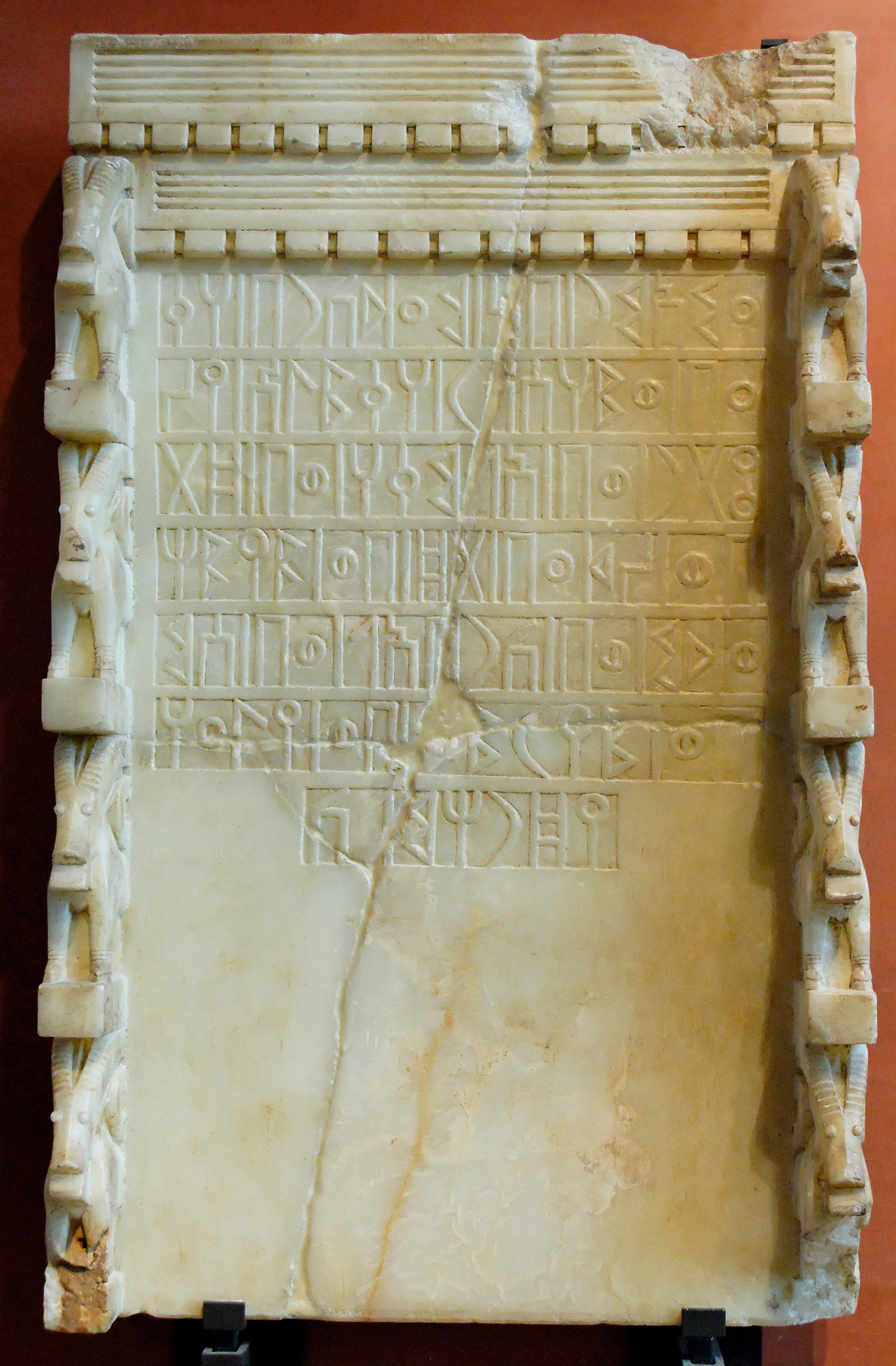
- Votive stele with Sabaic inscription addressed to the main Sabaean deity Almaqah, mentioning five other South Arabian gods, two reigning sovereigns and two governors: "Ammī'amar son of Ma'dīkarib dedicated to Almaqah Ra'suhumū. With 'Athtar, with Almaqah, with dhāt-Ḥimyam, with dhât-Ba'dân, with Waddum, with Karib'īl, with Sumhu'alī, with 'Ammīrayam and with Yadhrahmalik." Alabaster, c. 700 BC, Yemen, area of Ma'rib (?).
- Native to: Yemen
- Region: Arabian Peninsula
- Ethnicity: Sabaeans
- Extinct: 6th century
- Language family: Afro-Asiatic: Semitic; West Semitic; South Semitic?; Southwestern?; Sayhadic; Sabaic
- Dialects: ?Himyaritic †; ?Razihi; ?Rijal Alma
- Writing system: Ancient South Arabian

Language codes
- ISO 639-3: xsa
- Glottolog: saba1279

Sabaic, sometimes referred to as Sabaean, was a Ṣayhadic language that was spoken between c. 1000 BC and the 6th century AD by the Sabaeans. It was used as a written language by some other peoples of the ancient civilization of South Arabia, including the Ḥimyarites, Ḥashidites, Ṣirwāḥites, Humlanites, Ghaymānites, and Radmānites. Sabaic belongs to the South Arabian Semitic branch of the Afroasiatic language family. Sabaic is distinguished from the other members of the Sayhadic group by its use of h to mark the third person and as a causative prefix; all of the other languages use s_{1} in those cases. Therefore, Sabaic is called an h-language and the others s-languages. Numerous other Sabaic inscriptions have also been found dating back to the Sabean colonization of Africa.

Sabaic is very similar to Arabic and the languages may have been mutually intelligible.

== Script ==
Sabaic was written in the South Arabian alphabet, and, like Hebrew and Arabic, marked only consonants, the only indication of vowels being with matres lectionis. For many years the only texts discovered were inscriptions in the formal Masnad script (Sabaic ms_{3}nd), but in 1973 documents in another minuscule and cursive script were discovered, dating back to the second half of the 1st century BC; only a few of the latter have so far been published.

The South Arabian alphabet used in Yemen, Eritrea, Djibouti, and Ethiopia beginning in the 8th century BC, in all three locations, later evolved into the still-in-use Geʽez script. The Geʽez language however is no longer considered to be a descendant of Sabaic or of Sayhadic; and there is linguistic evidence that Semitic languages were concurrently in use, being spoken in Eritrea and Ethiopia as early as 2000 BC.

Sabaic is attested in some 1,040 dedicatory inscriptions, 850 building inscriptions, 200 legal texts, and 1300 short graffiti (containing only personal names). No literary texts of any length have yet been brought to light. This paucity of source material and the limited forms of the inscriptions has made it difficult to get a complete picture of Sabaic grammar. Thousands of inscriptions written in a cursive script (called Zabur) incised into wooden sticks have been found and date to the Middle Sabaic period; these represent letters and legal documents and as such include a much wider variety of grammatical forms.

== Varieties ==
- Sabaic: the language of the kingdom of Saba and later also of Ḥimyar; also documented in the kingdom of Da'amot; very well documented, c. 6000 inscriptions
  - Old Sabaic: mostly boustrophedon inscriptions from the 9th until the 8th century BC and including further texts in the next two centuries from Ma'rib and the Highlands.
  - Middle Sabaic: 3rd century BC until the end of the 3rd century AD. The best-documented language. The largest corpus of texts from this period comes from the Awwam Temple (otherwise known as Maḥrem Bilqīs) in Ma'rib.
    - Amiritic/Ḥaramitic: the language of the area to the north of Ma'īn
    - Central Sabaic: the language of the inscriptions from the Sabaean heartland
    - South Sabaic: the language of the inscriptions from Radmān and Ḥimyar
    - "Pseudo-Sabaic": the literary language of Arabian tribes in Najrān, Ḥaram and Qaryat al-Fāw
  - Late Sabaic: 4th–6th centuries AD. This is the monotheistic period when Christianity and Judaism brought Aramaic and Greek influences.

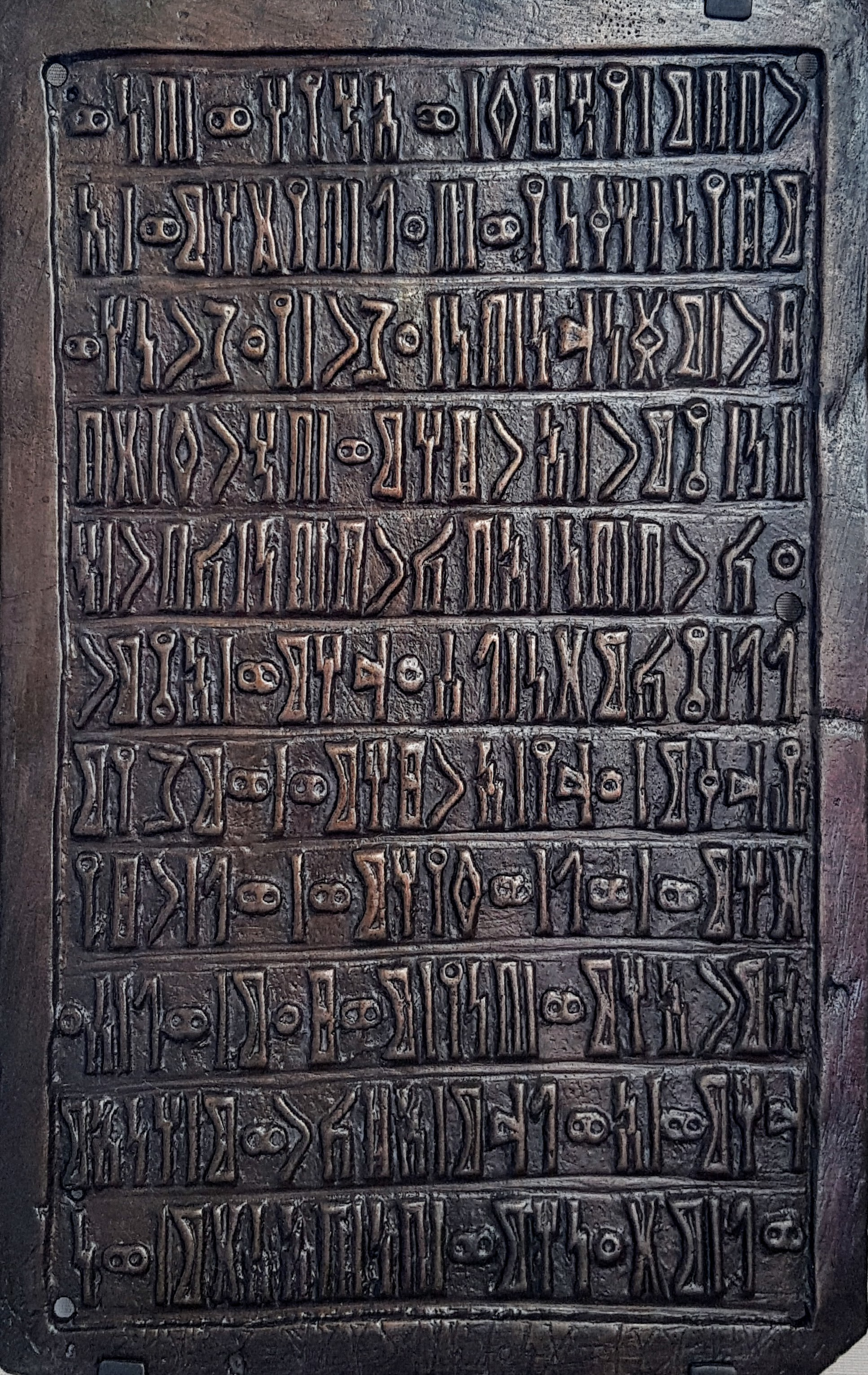
Bronze plaque, written in Sabaic. A dedication from Rabibum Yakhdaf 𐩧𐩨𐩨𐩣 𐩡 𐩺𐩭𐩳𐩰

In the Late Sabaic period the ancient names of the gods are no longer mentioned and only one deity Raḥmānān is referred to. The last known inscription in Sabaic dates from 554 or 559 AD. The language's eventual extinction was brought about by the later rapid expansion of Islam, bringing with it Classical Arabic (or Muḍarī Arabic), which became the language of culture and writing, totally supplanting Sabaic.

The dialect used in the western Yemeni highlands, known as Central Sabaic, is very homogeneous and generally used as the language of the inscriptions. Divergent dialects are usually found in the area surrounding the Central Highlands, such as the important dialect of the city of Ḥaram in the eastern al-Jawf. Inscriptions in the Ḥaramic dialect, which is heavily influenced by North Arabic, are also generally considered a form of Sabaic. The Himyarites, whose spoken language was Semitic but not South Arabian, used Sabaic as a written language.

== Phonology ==
=== Vowels ===
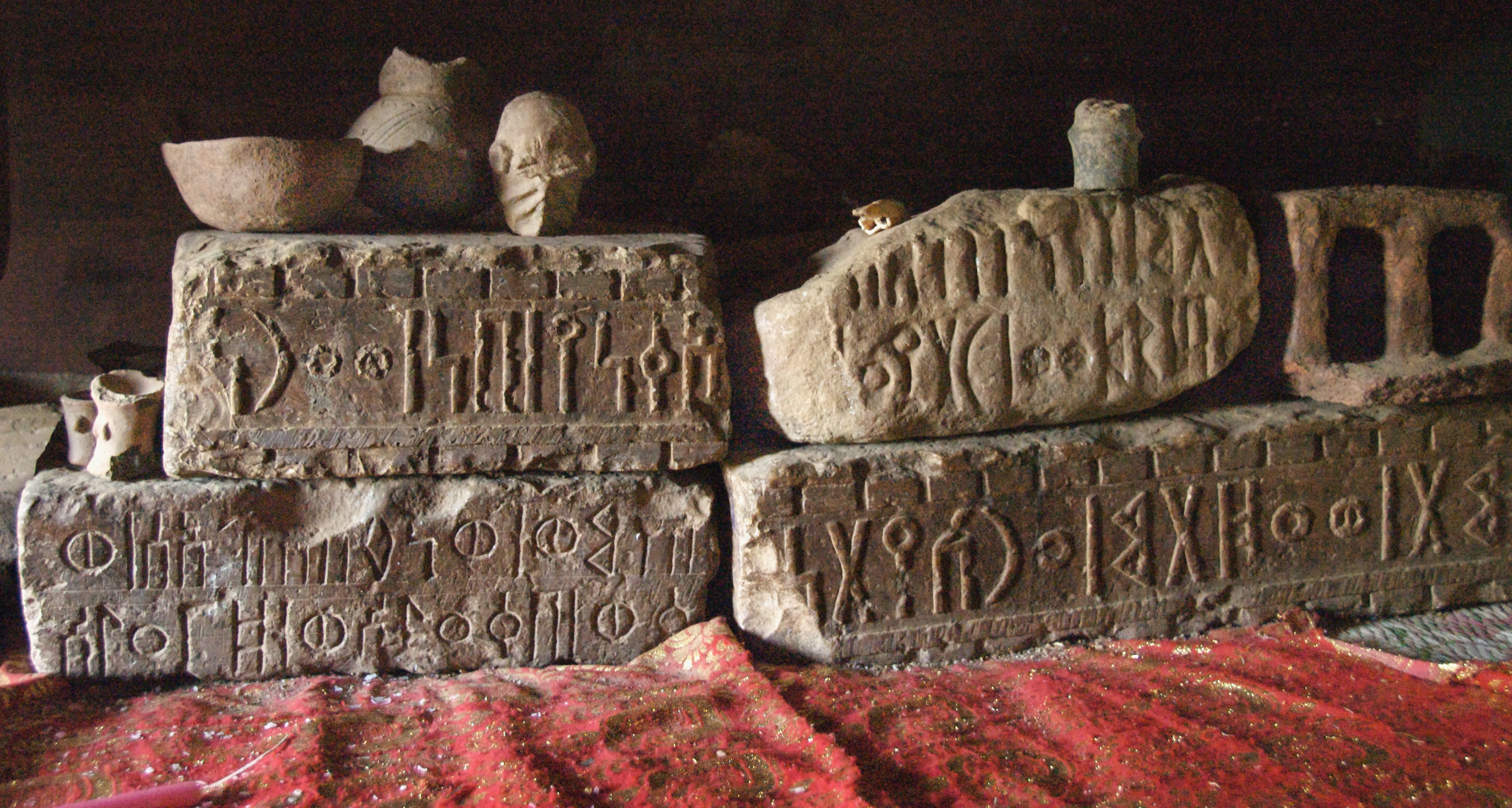
Ancient stone slabs with Sabaic inscriptions found at Yeha, Ethiopia

Since Sabaic is written in an abjad script leaving vowels unmarked, little can be said for certain about the vocalic system. However, based on other Semitic languages, it is generally presumed that it had at least the vowels a, i, and u, which would have occurred both short and long ā, ī, and ū. In Old Sabaic, the long vowels ū and ī are sometimes indicated using the letters for w and y as matres lectionis. In the Old period this is used mainly in word-final position, but in Middle and Late Sabaic it also commonly occurs medially. Sabaic has no way of writing the long vowel ā, but in later inscriptions, in the Radmanite dialect the letter h is sometimes infixed in plurals where it is not etymologically expected: thus bnhy ('sons of'; constructive state) instead of the usual bny; it is suspected that this h represents the vowel ā. Long vowels ū and ī certainly seem to be indicated in forms such as the personal pronouns hmw ('them'), the verbal form ykwn (also written without the glide ykn; 'he will be'), and in enclitic particles -mw, and -my probably used for emphasis.

=== Diphthongs ===
In the Old Sabaic inscriptions the Proto-Semitic diphthongs aw and ay seemed to have been retained, being written with the letters w and y; in the later stages the same words are increasingly found without these letters, which leads some scholars (such as Stein) to the conclusion that they had by then contracted to ō and ē (though aw → ū and ay → ī would also be possible)

=== Consonants ===
Sabaic, like Proto-Semitic, contains three sibilant phonemes, represented by distinct letters; the exact phonetic nature of these sounds is still uncertain. In the early days of Sabaic studies, Sayhadic was transcribed using Hebrew letters. The transcriptions of the alveolars or postvelar fricatives remained controversial; after a great deal of uncertainty in the initial period the lead was taken by the transcription chosen by Nikolaus Rhodokanakis and others for the Corpus Inscriptionum Semiticarum (s, š, and ś), until A. F. L. Beeston proposed replacing this with the representation with s followed by the subscripts 1–3. This latest version has largely taken over the English-speaking world, while in the German-speaking area, for example, the older transcription signs, which are also given in the table below, are more widespread. They were transcribed by Beeston as s_{1}, s_{2}, and s_{3}. Bearing in mind the latest reconstructions of the Proto-Semitic sibilants, we can postulate that s_{1} was probably pronounced as a simple [s] or [ʃ], s_{2} was probably a lateral fricative [ɬ], and s_{3} may have been realized as an affricate [t͡s]. The difference between the three sounds is maintained throughout Old Sabaic and Middle Sabaic, but in the Late period s_{1} and s_{3} merge. The subscript n did not start appearing until after the Early Sabaic period. The Middle Sabaic Haramitic dialect often shows the change s_{3} > s_{1}, for example: ˀks_{1}wt ("clothes"), normal Sabaic ks_{3}wy.

The exact nature of the emphatic consonants q, ṣ, ṭ, ẓ and ḍ also remains a matter for debate: were they pharyngealized as in Modern Arabic, or were they glottalized as in Ethiopic (and reconstructed Proto-Semitic)? There are arguments to support both possibilities. In any case, beginning with Middle Sabaic the letters representing ṣ and ẓ are increasingly interchanged, which seems to indicate that they have fallen together as one phoneme. The existence of bilabial fricative f as a reflex of the Proto-Semitic *p is partly proved by Latin transcriptions of names. In late Sabaic ḏ and z also merge. In Old Sabaic the sound n only occasionally assimilates to a following consonant, but in the later periods this assimilation is the norm. The minuscule Zabūr script does not seem to have a letter that represents the sound ẓ, and replaces it with ḍ instead; for example mfḍr ("a measure of capacity"), written in the Musnad script as mfẓr.

=== Sabaic consonants ===
		Bilabial	Dental	Alveolar	Post- alveolar	Palatal	Velar	Uvular	Pharyngeal	Glottal
Plosive	voiceless			t			k	q?		ʔ ⟨ʾ⟩
Plosive	voiced	b		d			ɡ			ʔ ⟨ʾ⟩
Plosive	emphatic			tˀ ⟨ṭ⟩			kʼ ⟨ḳ⟩?			ʔ ⟨ʾ⟩
Fricative	voiceless	f	θ ⟨ṯ⟩	s ⟨s_{3} /s⟩	ʃ ⟨s_{1} /š⟩		x ⟨ḫ⟩		ħ ⟨ḥ⟩	h
Fricative	voiced		ð ⟨ḏ⟩	z			ɣ ⟨ġ⟩		ʕ ⟨ˀ⟩	
Fricative	emphatic		θˀ ⟨ẓ⟩?	sˀ ⟨ṣ⟩?						
Nasal		m		n						
Lateral	voiceless			ɬ ⟨s_{2} /ś⟩						
Lateral	voiced			l						
Lateral	emphatic			ɬˀ ⟨ḍ⟩?						
Rhotic				r						
Semivowel		w				j ⟨y⟩				

== Grammar ==
=== Personal pronouns ===
As in other Semitic languages Sabaic had both independent pronouns and pronominal suffixes. The attested pronouns, along with suffixes from Qatabanian and Hadramautic are as follows:

		Pronominal suffixes		Independent pronouns
		Sabaic	Other languages	Sabaic
Singular	First person	-n		ʾn
Singular	Second person m.	-k	-k	ʾnt; ʾt
Singular	Second person f.	-k		
Singular	Third person m.	-hw, h	-s_{1}w(w), s_{1}	h(w)ʾ
Singular	3rd Person f.	-h, hw	-s_{1}, -s_{1}yw (Qataban.), -ṯ(yw), -s_{3}(yw) (Hadram.)	hʾ
Dual	2nd Person	-kmy	ʾtmy	
Dual	3rd Person com.	-hmy	-s_{1}mn (min.), -s_{1}my (Qataban.; Hadram.)	hmy
Dual	3rd Person m.		-s_{1}m(y)n (Hadram.)	
Plural	1st Person	-n		
Plural	2nd Person m.	-kmw		ʾntmw
Plural	2nd Person f.			
Plural	3. Person m.	-hm(w)	-s_{1}m	hmw
Plural	3. Person f.	-hn	-s_{1}n	hn

No independent pronouns have been identified in any of the other South Arabian languages. First- and second-person independent pronouns are rarely attested in the monumental inscription, but possibly for cultural reasons; the likelihood was that these texts were neither composed nor written by the one who commissioned them: hence they use third-person pronouns to refer to the one who is paying for the building and dedication or whatever. The use of the pronouns in Sabaic corresponds to that in other Semitic languages. The pronominal suffixes are added to verbs and prepositions to denote the object; thus: qtl-hmw "he killed them"; ḫmr-hmy t'lb "Ta'lab poured for them both"; when the suffixes are added to nouns they indicate possession: 'bd-hw "his slave").The independent pronouns serve as the subject of nominal and verbal sentences: mr' 't "you are the Lord" (a nominal sentence); hmw f-ḥmdw "they thanked" (a verbal sentence).

== Nouns ==
=== Case, number and gender ===
Sayhadic nouns fall into two genders: masculine and feminine. The feminine is usually indicated in the singular by the ending –t : bʿl "husband" (m.), bʿlt "wife" (f.), hgr "city" (m.), fnwt "canal" (f.). Sabaic nouns have forms for singular, dual and plural. The singular is formed without changing the stem, the plural can however be formed in a number of ways even in the very same word:

- Inner ("Broken") Plurals: as in Classical Arabic they are frequent.
  - ʾ-Prefix: ʾbyt "houses" from byt "house"
  - t-Suffix: especially frequent in words having the m-prefix: mḥfdt "towers" from mḥfd "tower".
  - Combinations: for example ʾ–prefix and t-suffix: ʾḫrft "years" from ḫrf "year", ʾbytt "houses" from byt "house".
  - without any external grammatical sign: fnw "canals" from fnwt (f.) "canal".
  - w-/y-Infix: ḫrwf / ḫryf / ḫryft "years" from ḫrf "year".
  - Reduplicational plurals are rarely attested in Sabaic: ʾlʾlt "gods" fromʾl "god".
- External ("Sound") plurals: in the masculine the ending differs according to the grammatical state (see below); in the feminine the ending is -(h)t, which probably represents *-āt; this plural is rare and seems to be restricted to a few nouns.

The dual is already beginning to disappear in Old Sabaic; its endings vary according to the grammatical state: ḫrf-n "two years" (indeterminate state) from ḫrf "year".

Sabaic almost certainly had a case system formed by vocalic endings, but since vowels were involved they are not recognizable in the writings; nevertheless a few traces have been retained in the written texts, above all in the construct state.

== Grammatical states ==
As in other Semitic languages Sabaic has a few grammatical states, which are indicated by various different endings according to the gender and the number. At the same time external plurals and duals have their own endings for grammatical state, while inner plurals are treated like singulars. Apart from the construct state known in other Semitic languages, there is also an indeterminate state and a determinate state, the functions of which are explained below. The following are the detailed state endings:

		Constr. state	Indet. state	Det. state
Masculine	Singular	-∅	-m	-n
Masculine	Dual	-∅ / -y	-n	-nhn
Masculine	External plural	-w / -y	-n	-nhn
Feminine	Singular	-t	-tm	-tn
Feminine	Dual	-ty	-tn	-tnhn
Feminine	External plural	-t	-tm	-tn

The three grammatical states have distinct syntactical and semantic functions:

- The Status indeterminatus: marks an indefinite, unspecified thing : ṣlm-m "any statue".
- The Status determinatus: marks a specific noun: ṣlm-n "the statue".
- The Status constructus: is introduced if the noun is bound to a genitive, a personal suffix or — contrary to other Semitic languages — with a relative sentence:
  - With a pronominal suffix: ʿbd-hw "his slave".
  - With a genitive noun: (Ḥaḑramite) gnʾhy myfʾt "both walls of Maifa'at", mlky s_{1}bʾ "both kings of Saba"
  - With a relative sentence: kl ^{1} s_{1}bʾt ^{2} w-ḍbyʾ ^{3} w-tqdmt ^{4} s_{1}bʾy^{5} w-ḍbʾ^{6} tqdmn^{7} mrʾy-hmw^{8} "all^{1} expeditions^{2}, battles^{3} and raids^{4}, their two lords ^{8} conducted^{5}, struck^{6} and led^{7}" (the nouns in the construct state are italicized here).

== Verbs ==
=== Conjugation ===
As in other West Semitic languages Sabaic distinguishes between two types of finite verb forms: the perfect which is conjugated with suffixes and the imperfect which is conjugated with both prefixes and suffixes. In the imperfect two forms can be distinguished: a short form and a form constructed using the n (long form esp. the n-imperfect), which in any case is missing in Qatabānian and Ḥaḍramite. In actual use it is hard to distinguish the two imperfect forms from each other. The conjugation of the perfect and imperfect may be summarized as follows (the active and the passive are not distinguished in their consonantal written form; the verbal example is fʿl "to do"):

		Perfect	Imperfect	
		Perfect	Short form	Long form
Singular	1. P.	fʿl-k (?)		
Singular	2. P. m.	fʿl-k		
Singular	2. P. f.	fʿl-k	t-fʿl	t-fʿl-n
Singular	3. P. m.	fʿl	y-fʿl	y-fʿl-n
Singular	3. P. f.	fʿl-t	t-fʿl	t-fʿl-n
Dual	3. P. m.	fʿl(-y)	y-fʿl-y	y-fʿl-nn
Dual	3. P. f.	fʿl-ty	t-fʿl-y	t-fʿl-nn
Plural	2. P. m.	fʿl-kmw		t-fʿl-nn
Plural	3. P. m.	fʿl-w	y-fʿl-w	y-fʿl-nn
Plural	3. P. f.	fʿl-y, fʿl-n (?)	t-fʿl-n(?)	t-fʿl-nn(?)

==== Perfect ====
The perfect is mainly used to describe something that took place in the past, only before conditional phrases and in relative phrases with a conditional connotation does it describe an action in the present, as in Classical Arabic. For example: w-s_{3}ḫly Hlkʾmr w-ḥmʿṯt "And Hlkʾmr and ḥmʿṯt have pleaded guilty (dual)".

==== Imperfect ====
The imperfect usually expresses that something has occurred at the same time as an event previously mentioned, or it may simply express the present or future. Four moods can be distinguished:

1. Indicative: in Sabaic this has no special marker, though it has in some of the other languages: b-y-s_{2}ṭ "he trades" (Qatabānian). With the meaning of the perfect: w-y-qr zydʾl b-wrḫh ḥtḥr "Zaid'il died in the month of Hathor" (Minaean).
2. Precative is formed with l- and expresses wishes: w-l-y-ḫmrn-hw ʾlmqhw "may Almaqahu grant him".
3. Jussive is also formed with l- and stands for an indirect order: l-yʾt "so should it come".
4. Vetitive is formed with the negative ʾl. It serves to express negative wishes: w-ʾl y-hwfd ʿlbm "and no ʿilb-trees may be planted here“.

=== Imperative ===
The imperative is found in texts written in the zabūr script on wooden sticks, and has the form fˁl(-n). For example: w-'nt f-s_{3}ḫln ("and you (sg.) look after").

=== Derived stems ===
By changing the consonantal roots of verbs they can produce various derivational forms, which change their meaning. In Sabaic (and other Sahyadic languages) six such stems are attested. Examples:

- qny "to receive" > hqny "to sacrifice; to donate"
- qwm "to decree" > hqm "to decree", tqwmw "to bear witness"

== Syntax ==
=== Position of clauses ===
The arrangement of clauses is not consistent in Sabaic. The first clause in an inscription always has the order (particle - ) subject – predicate (SV), the other main clauses of an inscription are introduced by w- "and" and always have – like subordinate clauses – the order predicate – subject (VS). At the same time the Predicate may be introduced by f.

Examples:

At the beginning of an inscription; SVO
s_{1}ʿdʾl w-rʾbʾl	s_{3}lʾ	w-sqny	ʿṯtr	kl	ġwṯ
S_{1}ʿdʾl and Rʾbʾl	they have offered up (3rd person plural perfect)	and have consecrated (3rd person plural perfect)	Athtar	complete	repair
Subject	Predicate		Indirect object	Direct object	
"S_{1}ʿdʾl and Rʾbʾl have offered up and consecrated all the repairs to Athtar".

Introduced by w; SVO
w-ʾws_{1}ʾl	f-ḥmd	mqm	ʾlmqh
and Awsil	and he thanked (3rd-person sg. perfect)	Does (stat. constr.)	Almaqah
"and" – subject	"and" – predicate	Object	
"And Awsil thanked the power of Almaqah"

=== Subordinate clauses ===
Sabaic is equipped with a number of means to form subordinate clauses using various conjunctions:

Main clause with ensuing object clause
Main clause	Subordinate clause				
w-y-s_{1}mʿ-w	k-nblw	hmw	ʾgrn	b-ʿbr	ʾḥzb ḥbs_{2}t
"and" – 3rd p. pl. imperfect	Conjunction – 3rd p. pl. perfect	Attribute	Subject	Preposition	Prepositional object
And they heard	that they sent	these	Najranites	to	Abyssinian tribes
And they heard, that these Najranites had sent a delegation to the Abyssinian tribes.

Conditional clause with apodosis
Subordinate clause		Subordinate clause	
w-hmy	hfnk	f-tʿlmn	b-hmy
"And" – conjunction	2. person sg. perfect	"Then" – imperative	Pronominal phrase
And if	you sent	and sign	on it
And if you send (it), sign it.

==== Relative clauses ====
In Sabaic, relative clauses are marked by a Relativiser like ḏ-, ʾl, mn-; in free relative clauses this marking is obligatory. Unlike other Semitic languages in Sabaic resumptive pronouns are only rarely found.

Free Relative clause after mn-mw
mn-mw	ḏ-	-y-s_{2}ʾm-n	ʿbdm	f-ʾw	ʾmtm
"who" – enclitic	Relativiser	3rd-person singular n-imperfect	Object	"and/ or"	Object
who		he buys	a male slave	or	a female slave
Whoever buys a male or female slave [...]

Attributive relative clause (Qataban.) with nominal predicate
Main clause		Relative clause			
ḏn	mḥfdn yḥḏr	ḏm	b-s_{2}hd	gnʾ	hgr-sm
Demonstrative pronoun	Subject	Relativiser	Preposition	Prepositional object	Possessor
this	the tower yḥḏr	which	opposite	wall	her city
this tower yḥḏr, which stands opposite the walls of her city (is located).

Attributive relative clause with a prepositional predicate and resumptive
ʾl-n	ḏ-	-l-	-hw	smyn w-ʾrḍn
God – Nunation	Relativiser	Preposition	Object (resumptive)	Subject
the God	which	for	him	heaven and earth
God, for Whom the heavens and the earth are = God, to Whom the heaven and the earth belong

== Vocabulary ==
Although the Sabaic vocabulary is found in relatively diverse types of inscriptions (an example being that the south Semitic tribes derive their word wtb meaning "to sit" from the northwest tribe's word yashab/wtb meaning "to jump"), nevertheless it stands relatively isolated in the Semitic realm, something that makes it more difficult to analyze. Even given the existence of closely related languages such as Ge'ez and Classical Arabic, only part of the Sabaic vocabulary has proved able to be interpreted; a not inconsiderable part must be deduced from the context and some words remain incomprehensible. On the other hand, many words from agriculture and irrigation technology have been retrieved from the works of Yemeni scholars of the Middle Ages and partially also from the modern Yemeni dialects. Foreign loanwords are rare in Sabaic, a few Greek and Aramaic words are found in the Rahmanistic, Christian and Jewish period (5th–7th centuries AD) for example: qls1-n from the Greek ἐκκλησία "church", which still survives in the Arabic al-Qillīs referring to the church built by Abrahah in Sanaa.

== See also ==
- Old South Arabian
- Ancient South Arabian script
- Himyaritic language
- Geʽez
- Kingdom of Aksum
- Sabaeans
- Himyarite Kingdom
- Sheba
- Eduard Glaser
- Carl Rathjens
- Joseph Halévy
- Walter W. Müller

== Bibliography ==
- A. F. L. Beeston: Sabaic Grammar, Manchester 1984 ISBN 0-9507885-2-X.
- A.F.L. Beeston, M.A. Ghul, W.W. Müller, J. Ryckmans: Sabaic Dictionary / Dictionnaire sabéen /al-Muʿdscham as-Sabaʾī (Englisch-Französisch-Arabisch) Louvain-la-Neuve, 1982 ISBN 2-8017-0194-7
- Joan Copeland Biella: Dictionary of Old South Arabic. Sabaean dialect. Eisenbrauns, 1982 ISBN 1-57506-919-9
- Maria Höfner: Altsüdarabische Grammatik (Porta linguarum Orientalium, Band 24) Leipzig, 1943
- Kogan, Leonid; Korotayev, Andrey (1997). "Sayhadic Languages (Epigraphic South Arabian)". Semitic Languages. London: Routledge. pp. 157–183.
- Anne Multhoff: Die sabäischen Inschriften aus Marib. Katalog, Übersetzung und Kommentar [The Sabaean inscriptions from Marib. Catalogue, translation and commentary] (Epigraphische Forschungen auf der Arabischen Halbinsel 9). Verlag Marie Leidorf, Rahden (Westfalen) 2021, ISBN 978-3-86757-130-2.
- N. Nebes, P. Stein: "Ancient South Arabian", in: Roger D. Woodard (Hrsg.): The Cambridge Encyclopedia of the World's Ancient Languages (Cambridge University Press, Cambridge 2004) ISBN 0-521-56256-2 S. 454–487 (grammatical sketch with Bibliography).
- Jacques Ryckmans, Walter W. Müller, Yusuf M. Abdallah: Textes du Yémen antique inscrits sur bois [Texts from ancient Yemen inscribed on wood] (Publications de l'Institut Orientaliste de Louvain 43). Institut Orientaliste, Louvain 1994. ISBN 2-87723-104-6
- Peter Stein, Untersuchungen zur Phonologie und Morphologie des Sabäischen [Studies on the phonology and morphology of Sabaean] (Epigraphische Forschungen auf der Arabischen Halbinsel 3). Rahden 2003, ISBN 3-89646-683-6.
- Peter Stein: Die altsüdarabischen Minuskelinschriften auf Holzstäbchen aus der Bayerischen Staatsbibliothek in München 1: Die Inschriften der mittel- und spätsabäischen Periode [The Old South Arabian minuscule inscriptions on wooden sticks from the Bayerische Staatsbibliothek in Munich 1: The inscriptions of the Middle and Late Sabaean period] (Epigraphische Forschungen auf der Arabischen Halbinsel 5). Tübingen u.a. 2010. ISBN 978-3-8030-2200-4
- Peter Stein: Die altsüdarabischen Minuskelinschriften auf Holzstäbchen aus der Bayerischen Staatsbibliothek in München. Band 2: Die altsabäischen und minäaischen Inschriften [The Old South Arabian minuscule inscriptions on wooden sticks from the Bayerische Staatsbibliothek in Munich 1: The Old Sabaean and Minaean inscriptions] (Epigraphische Forschungen auf der Arabischen Halbinsel. Band 10). Wiesbaden, 2023. ISBN 978-3-7520-0704-6
- Peter Stein, Lehrbuch der sabäischen Sprache [Sabaean language textbook]. 2 volumes. Wiesbaden: Harrassowitz, ISBN 978-3-447-10026-7 (volume 1) and ISBN 978-3-447-06768-3 (volume 2).
- Sabaic Online Dictionary
