= Razih district =

Coordinates: 17°00′N 43°25′E

Razih District مديرية رازح
- District
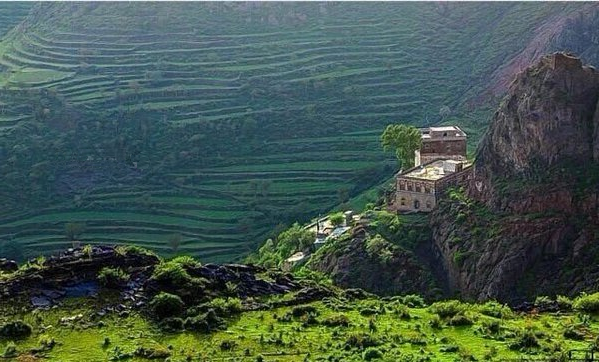
- Interactive map of Razih District
- Country: Yemen
- Governorate: Saada

Area
  - Total: 232 km^{2} (90 sq mi)
- Elevation: 1,755 m (5,758 ft)

Population (2015)Estimated
  - Total: 86,620 (62,915 in 2,003)
  - Density: 373/km^{2} (970/sq mi)
- Time zone: UTC+3 (Yemen Standard Time)

Razih District (Arabic: مديرية رازح) is a district of the Saada Governorate, Yemen. As of 2003, the district had a population of 62,915 inhabitants. It covers an area of approximately 232 square kilometres.

== Language ==
The inhabitants of Razih District speak the Razihi language, a unique South Semitic variety distinct from Arabic that is spoken only in this region of northwestern Yemen.
