= Ancient South Arabian =

Group of four extinct languages and possibly three modern languages

- Old South Arabian, Yemenite, Ṣayhadic
- Ethnicity: Ancient Yemenis
- Era: 8th century BC to 6th century CE
- Language family: Afro-Asiatic: Semitic; West Semitic; Central Semitic; Ancient South Arabian
- Dialects: Sabaic † • ? Himyaritic † • ? Razihi • ? Rijāl Almaʿ; Minaeic (Madhabic) †; Qatabanic † • Awsānian †; Hadramitic †; ? Faifi; ? /-k/ dialects of Arabic • Yāfiʿī Arabic
- Writing system: Ancient South Arabian script, Latin script

Language codes
- ISO 639-3: –
- Glottolog: sayh1236

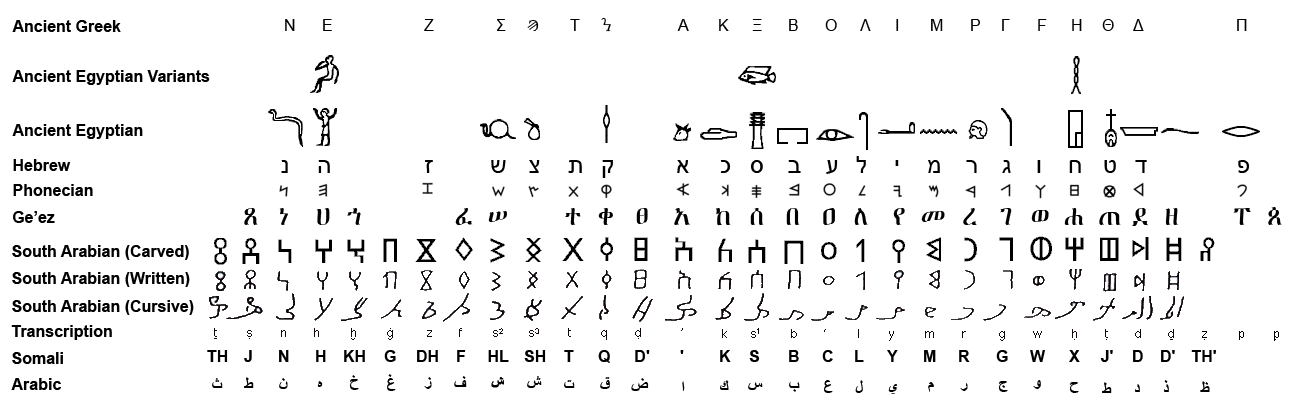
Transliteration key for South Arabian in several scripts

Ancient South Arabian (ASA), also known as Old South Arabian (OSA), Epigraphic South Arabian, Ṣayhadic, or Yemenite, is a group of four closely related extinct languages (Sabaean/Sabaic, Qatabanic, Hadramitic, Minaic) spoken in the far southern portion of the Arabian Peninsula. The earliest preserved records belonging to the group are dated to the beginning of the 1st millennium BCE. They were written in the Ancient South Arabian script.

There were a number of other Old South Arabian languages (e.g. Awsānian), of which very little evidence has survived, however. A set of possible surviving Sayhadic languages is attested in the Razihi language, Rijal Alma language, and Faifi language spoken in far north-west of Yemen and far south-west of Saudi Arabia, though these varieties of speech have both Arabic and Sayhadic features, and it is difficult to classify them as either Arabic dialects with a Sayhadic substratum, or Sayhadic languages that have been restructured under pressure of Arabic.

== Classification issues ==
It was originally thought that all four members of this group were dialects of one Old South Arabian language, but in the mid-twentieth century, linguist A.F.L. Beeston finally proved that they did in fact constitute independent languages.

The Old South Arabian languages were originally classified (partly on the basis of geography) as South Semitic, along with Modern South Arabian and Ethiopian Semitic; more recently however, a new classification has come in use which places Old South Arabian, along with Arabic, Ugaritic, Aramaic and Canaanite/Hebrew in a Central Semitic group; leaving Modern South Arabian and Ethiopic in a separate group. This new classification is based on Arabic, Old South Arabian and Northwest Semitic (Ugaritic, Aramaic and Canaanite) sharing an innovation in the verbal system, an imperfect taking the form *yVqtVl-u (the other groups have *yVqattVl); Nebes showed that Sabaean at least had the form yVqtVl in the imperfect.

Even though it has been now accepted that the four main languages be considered independent, they are clearly closely related linguistically and derive from a common ancestor because they share certain morphological innovations. One of the most important isoglosses retained in all four languages is the suffixed definite article -(h)n, another proposed common innovation being the formation of 1st and 2nd person perfect verbal forms with -k (which is also a feature of Yemeni Arabic attributable to a Sayhadic substrate). There are however significant differences between the languages, so much so that Stein proposes a relationship between Sabaic and Aramaic, with a primary split setting it apart from the other Sayhadic languages on the basis of the h/s isogloss in the formation of the personal pronouns and the causative stem further positing a closer relationship between Minaic and Hadramitic with the Ethiopian Semitic and Modern South Arabian branches.

The four main Sayhadic languages were: Sabaean, Minaeic (or Madhabic), Qatabanic, and Hadramitic.

Sayhadic had its own writing system, the Ancient South Arabian Monumental Script, or Ms^{3}nd, consisting of 29 graphemes concurrently used for proto-Geʿez in the Kingdom of Dʿmt, ultimately sharing a common origin with the other Semitic abjads, the Proto-Sinaitic alphabet. Inscriptions in another minuscule cursive script written on wooden sticks have also been discovered.

The last inscription of these languages has been dated to 554 CE, 60 years before the appearance of Islam.

== Languages ==
Old South Arabian comprised a number of languages; the following are those that have been preserved in writing (the dates follow the so-called long chronology). Besides these, at least Razihi may be a surviving Old South Arabian language.

- Sabaean: the language of the kingdom of Saba and later also of Ḥimyar; also documented in the Ethiopian kingdom of Da'amot; very well documented, ca. 6,000 Inscriptions
  - Old Sabaean: 8th until 2nd century BC.
  - Middle Sabaean: 1st century BC until the 4th century AD (the best documented language)
    - Ḥaramitic: the language of the area to the north of Ma'īn
    - Central Sabaean: the language of the inscriptions from the Sabaean heartland
    - South Sabaean: the language of the inscriptions from Radman and Ḥimyar
    - "Pseudo-Sabaean": the literary language of Arabian tribes in Najrān, Haram and Qaryat al-Fāw
  - Late Sabaean: 5th and 6th centuries AD.
- Minaean: (also called Madhabian): the language of the city states in al-Jawf − with the exception of Haram − especially the later sparsely populated state of Ma'in (recorded from the 8th until 2nd century BC). Inscriptions have also been found outside Ma'īn in the commercial colonies of Dedan and Madā'in Ṣāliḥ, in Egypt and also on Delos. (ca. 500 inscriptions)
- Qatabānian: the language of the kingdom of Qatabān, recorded from the 5th century BC until the 2nd century (barely 2,000 inscriptions)
  - Awsānian: the language of the kingdom of Awsān, poorly recorded (ca. 25 inscriptions, 8th/ 1st century BC until about the 1st century AD). Indistinguishable from Qatabānian.
  - Other varieties such as the language of the tribe of Radmān
- Hadramautic (or Ḥaḍramitic): the language of Ḥaḍramaut, with an additional inscription from the Greek island of Delos. 5th century BC until the 4th century AD, with ca. 1,000 inscriptions.

== Written records ==
Old South Arabian was written in the Old South Arabian script, a consonantal abjad deriving from the Phoenician alphabet. Compared with other parts of the ancient world, Palestine for instance, the number of surviving inscriptions is very high. Something in the region of 10,000 inscriptions exist. The Sabaean lexicon contains about 2,500 words.

=== Categories of written records ===
1. Inscriptions in stone
  1. Votive inscriptions, which often preserve historical accounts of the events that led to the dedication
  2. Inscriptions on buildings: give the names of the person who commissioned the work and the historical circumstances among other things
  3. Laws and legislation
  4. Protocols and deeds
  5. Inscriptions written for atonement or repentance
  6. Graffiti on rocks
2. Literary texts: if large numbers of any such texts ever existed, they have been almost completely lost
3. Inscriptions on wooden cylinders (Old, Middle and Late Sabaean and Hadramite). There are about 840 texts published so far.
  1. Private texts
  2. Contracts and orders
4. Inscriptions on everyday objects

The inscriptions on stone display a very formal and precise wording and expression, whereas the style of the wooden inscriptions written in the cursive script is much more informal.

== Phonology ==
Old South Arabian consonants
		Bilabial	Dental		Alveolar		Postalveolar	Palatal	Velar	Uvular	Pharyngeal	Glottal
		Bilabial	Non-emph.	Emphatic	Non-emph.	Emphatic	Postalveolar	Palatal	Velar	Uvular	Pharyngeal	Glottal
Plosives	vcelss.				t	tˀ (ṭ)			k	q(q/ḳ)		ʔ ( ʾ)
Plosives	vced.	b			d				ɡ (g)			
Fricatives	vcelss.	f	θ (ṯ)	θˀ (ẓ)	s (s_{3} / ś)	sˀ (ṣ)	ʃ (s_{1} / s)		x (ḫ)		ħ (ḥ)	h
Fricatives	vced.		ð (ḏ)		z				ɣ (ġ)		ʕ (ʿ)	
Nasals		m			n							
Laterals					l							
Rhotics					r							
Approximants		w						j (y)				
Lateral Fricative	vcless.				ɬ (s_{2} / š)	ɬˀ (ḍ)						

== History of research and teaching ==
Although the inscriptions from ancient South Arabia were already known by the 18th century, it was Wilhelm Gesenius (1786–1842) and his student Emil Rödiger who finally undertook the deciphering of the script, actually independently of each other, in the years 1841/42. Then in the second half of the 19th century Joseph Halévy and Eduard Glaser brought hundreds of Old South Arabian inscriptions, possible tracings and copies back to Europe. On the basis of this large amount of material Fritz Hommel prepared a selection of texts in 1893 along with an attempt at a grammar. Later on the Sabaean expert Nikolaus Rhodokanakis made especially important steps towards understanding Old South Arabian. A completely new field of Old South Arabian script and texts has opened up since the 1970s with the discovery of wooden cylinders on which Sabaean has been written with a pen. The unknown script and numerous incomprehensible words present Sabaean studies with new problems, and to this day the wooden cylinders are not completely understood.

In the German-speaking world, Old South Arabian is taught in the framework of Semitic Studies, and no independent university chair has been dedicated to Old South Arabian (or Sabaean) Studies. Learning Old South Arabian at least furthers the student’s knowledge of the characteristics of Semitic by introducing him or her to a less well-preserved example of the group. Students normally begin to learn the grammar of Old South Arabian and then they finally read a few of the longer texts.

== See also ==
- Ancient North Arabian
- Old Arabic
- Undeciphered -k language of ancient Yemen
- Modern South Arabian languages

== Bibliography ==
Short introductions and overviews

- Al-Jallad, Ahmad (2020). "The Linguistic Landscape of pre-Islamic Arabia: Context for the Qur'an". In Shah, Mustafa; Haleem, M.A.S. Abdel (eds.). The Oxford Handbook of Qur'anic Studies. Oxford University Press. pp. 111–127.
- Nebes, Norbert; Stein, Peter (2008). "Ancient South Arabian". In Woodard, Roger D. (ed.). The Ancient Languages of Syria-Palestine and Arabia (PDF). Cambridge: Cambridge University Press. pp. 145–178. doi:10.1017/CBO9780511486890. ISBN 978-0-521-68498-9.
- Peter Stein: Ancient South Arabian. In: Stefan Weninger (Hrsg.): The Semitic Languages: An International Handbook. De Gruyter Mouton, Berlin 2011, ISBN 3110186136, pp. 1042–1073.

Grammar

- Mounir Arbach: Le madhabien: lexique, onomastique et grammaire d'une langue de l'Arabie méridionale préislamique [Madhabic: lexicon, onomastics and grammar of a language of pre-Islamic southern Arabia]. 3 volumes. Aix-en-Provence, 1993 (Includes a grammar, a lexicon and a list of Minaean personal names)
- Beeston, A. F. L. (1984). Sabaic Grammar. Manchester. ISBN 0-9507885-2-X.
- Koutchoukali, Imar Yacine (November 24, 2023). “Our ʿirbīt is not like your ʿarabiyya” Linguistic and socio-political change in late antique South Arabia (550 – 850 AD) (Thesis). ISBN 978-9916-27-401-9.
- Maria Höfner: Altsüdarabische Grammatik [Old South Arabian Grammar]. Porta Linguarum Orientalium, volume 24. Leipzig, 1943.
- Kogan, Leonid; Korotayev, Andrey (1997). "Sayhadic Languages (Epigraphic South Arabian)". Semitic Languages. London: Routledge. pp. 157–183.
- Norbert Nebes, Peter Stein: Ancient South Arabian, in: Roger D. Woodard (Hrsg.): The Cambridge encyclopedia of the World's ancient languages Cambridge University Press, Cambridge 2004 ISBN 0-521-56256-2 S. 454–487 (grammatical overview with bibliography).
- Peter Stein: Lehrbuch der Sabäischen Sprache [Textbook of the Sabaean language]. 2 volumes. Harrassowitz, Wiesbaden 2012/2013, ISBN 978-3-447-10026-7.

Dictionaries

- A. F. L. Beeston, M. A. Ghul, W. W. Müller, J. Ryckmans: Sabaic Dictionary / Dictionnaire sabéen /al-Muʿdscham as-Sabaʾī (Englisch-Französisch-Arabisch) Louvain-la-Neuve, 1982 ISBN 2-8017-0194-7
- Joan Copeland Biella: Dictionary of Old South Arabic. Sabaean dialect Eisenbrauns, 1982 ISBN 1-57506-919-9
- S.D. Ricks: Lexicon of Inscriptional Qatabanian (Studia Pohl, 14), Pontifical Biblical Institute, Rome 1989
- Sabaic Online Dictionary

Collections of texts

- Alessandra Avanzini: Corpus of South Arabian Inscriptions I-III. Qatabanic, Marginal Qatabanic, Awsanite Inscriptions (Arabia Antica 2). Ed. PLUS, Pisa 2004. ISBN 88-8492-263-1
- Abraham J. Drewes, Jacques Ryckmans: Les inscriptions sudarabes sur bois dans la collection de l’Oosters Instituut conservée dans la bibliothèque universitaire de Leiden [South arabic inscriptions on wood in the Oosters Instituut collection housed in the Leiden University Library]. Harrassowitz, Wiesbaden 2016, ISBN 3-447-10589-5.
- Barbara Jändl: Altsüdarabische Inschriften auf Metall [Old South Arabian inscriptions on metal]. Epigraphische Forschungen auf der Arabischen Halbinsel, volume 4. Tübingen, Berlin 2009. ISBN 978-3-8030-2201-1
- Mohammed Maraqten: Altsüdarabische Texte auf Holzstäbchen. Epigraphische und kulturhistorische Untersuchungen [Old South Arabian texts on wooden sticks. Epigraphic and cultural-historical studies]. Beiruter Texte und Studien, volume 103. Ergon-Verlag, Würzburg 2014, ISBN 978-3-95650-034-3.
  - See the remarks by Stein, Peter (2015). "Review: Beschriftete Holzstäbchen aus dem Jemen". Orientalia. 84 (1): 75–98. JSTOR 26153282.
- Anne Multhoff: Die sabäischen Inschriften aus Marib. Katalog, Übersetzung und Kommentar [The Sabaic inscriptions from Marib. Catalogue, translation and commentary]. Epigraphische Forschungen auf der Arabischen Halbinsel, volume 9. Verlag Marie Leidorf, Rahden (Westfalen) 2021, ISBN 978-3-86757-130-2.
- Jacques Ryckmans, Walter W. Müller, Yusuf M. Abdallah: Textes du Yémen antique inscrits sur bois [Texts of ancient Yemen inscribed in wood]. Publications de l'Institut Orientaliste de Louvain, volume 43. Institut Orientaliste, Louvain 1994. ISBN 2-87723-104-6
- Stein, Peter (2010). Die altsüdarabischen Minuskelinschriften auf Holzstäbchen aus der Bayerischen Staatsbibliothek in München 1: Die Inschriften der mittel- und spätsabäischen Periode [The Old South Arabian minuscule inscriptions on wooden sticks from the Bayerische Staatsbibliothek in Munich 1: The inscriptions of the Middle and Late Sabaean period]. Epigraphische Forschungen auf der Arabischen Halbinsel (in German). Vol. 5. Tübingen. ISBN 978-3-8030-2200-4.
- Stein, Peter (2023). Die altsüdarabischen Minuskelinschriften auf Holzstäbchen aus der Bayerischen Staatsbibliothek in München 2: Die altsabäischen und minäaischen Inschriften [The Old South Arabian minuscule inscriptions on wooden sticks from the Bavarian State Library in Munich 2: The Old Sabaean and Minaean inscriptions]. Epigraphische Forschungen auf der Arabischen Halbinsel (in German). Vol. 10. Wiesbaden. ISBN 978-3-7520-0704-6.
