= Amnot =

Am Not
- Village
- Location in Oman
- Coordinates: 17°10′N 54°5′E
- Country: Oman
- Governorate: Dhofar Governorate
- Time zone: UTC+4 (Oman Standard Time)

Amnot is a village in Dhofar Governorate, in southwestern Oman.
