= Ash Shuwaymiyyah =

Ash Shuwaymiyyah الشويمية Ash Shuwaymīyah, Al Shuwaymiya, Shu‘aymiah, Shu‘aymīyah, Shuwaymiya
- Village
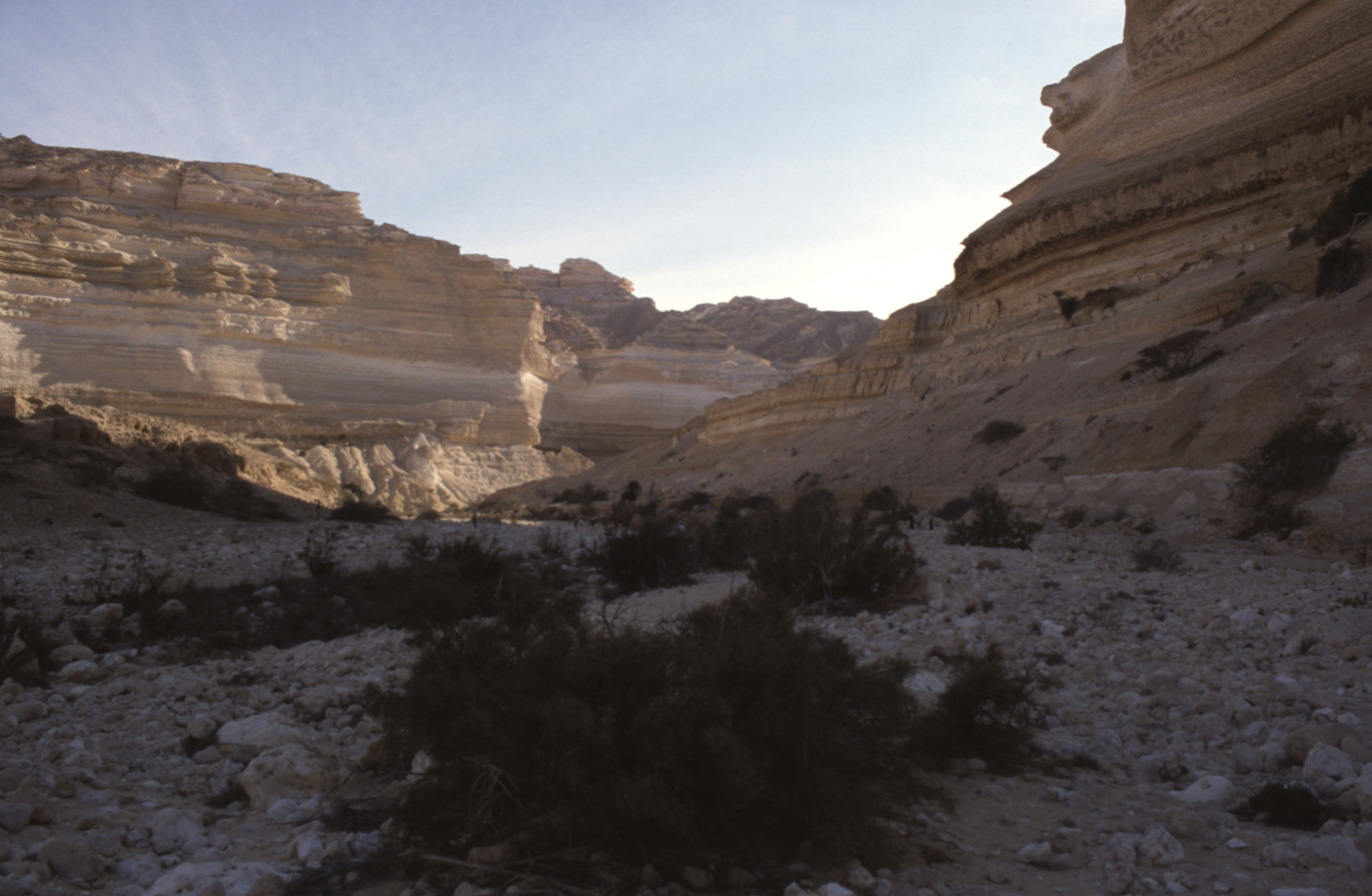
- Wadi ash-Shuwaymiyah

- Location in Oman
- Coordinates: 17°53′N 55°36′E
- Country: Oman
- Governorate: Dhofar Governorate
- Province: Shalim and the Hallaniyat Islands

Population (2024)
  - Total: 1,059
- Time zone: UTC+4 (Oman Standard Time)

Ash Shuwaymiyyah (Arabic: الشويمية, romanized: Ash Shuwaymīyah) is a coastal village in the Dhofar Governorate, in southern Oman. In 2024, it had a population of 1,059. It is home to one of the largest gypsum mines in Oman, where a mining port is planned for construction.

As of 2019, the village is one of the last places where the Baṭḥari language is spoken.
