= Araft =

Sahal Tooq Ashdeeh Beesh
- plain
- Location in Oman
- Coordinates: 17°0′N 53°59′E
- Country: Oman
- Governorate: Dhofar Governorate
- Time zone: UTC+4 (Oman Standard Time)

Sahal Tooq is a plain in Dhofar Governorate, in southwestern Oman.
