= Arkut =

" حدب ذومري Hadab Dhumri "
- Village
- Location in Oman
- Coordinates: 17°08′N 54°10′E
- Country: Oman
- Governorate: Dhofar Governorate
- Time zone: UTC+4 (Oman Standard Time)

حدب ذومري is a village in Dhofar Governorate, in southwestern Oman.
