= Jardum =

- Village
- Location in Oman
- Coordinates: 17°04′N 53°57′E
- Country: Oman
- Governorate: Dhofar Governorate
- Time zone: UTC+4 (Oman Standard Time)

Jardum is a village in Dhofar Governorate, in southwestern Oman.
