= Azeyrenawt =

- Village
- Location in Oman
- Coordinates: 17°06′N 54°02′E
- Country: Oman
- Governorate: Dhofar Governorate
- Time zone: UTC+4 (Oman Standard Time)

Azeyrenawt is a village in Dhofar Governorate, in southwestern Oman.
