= Bayt Fiqayt =

- Village
- Location in Oman
- Coordinates: 17°09′N 54°25′E
- Country: Oman
- Governorate: Dhofar Governorate
- Time zone: UTC+4 (Oman Standard Time)

Bayt Fiqayt is a village in Dhofar Governorate in southwestern Oman, close to the capital Salalah.
