= ʽAwqad Bayt Fadil =

`Awqad
- Village
- Location in Oman
- Coordinates: 17°00′N 54°03′E
- Country: Oman
- Governorate: Dhofar Governorate
- Time zone: UTC+4 (Oman Standard Time)

`Awqad Bayt Fadil is a village in Dhofar Governorate, in southwestern Oman.
