= Siserun =

- Village
- Location in Oman
- Coordinates: 17°07′53″N 54°02′32″E
- Country: Oman
- Governorate: Dhofar Governorate
- Time zone: UTC+4 (Oman Standard Time)

Siserun is a village in Dhofar Governorate, in southwestern Oman.
