= Qadhait =

- Village
- Location in Oman
- Coordinates: 17°07′N 54°27′E
- Country: Oman
- Governorate: Dhofar Governorate
- Elevation: 183 m (600 ft)
- Time zone: UTC+4 (Oman Standard Time)

Qadhait is a village in Dhofar Governorate, in southwestern Oman.
