= Ash Shawr =

- Village
- Location in Oman
- Coordinates: 17°09′N 54°19′E
- Country: Oman
- Governorate: Dhofar Governorate
- Time zone: UTC+4 (Oman Standard Time)

Ash Shawr is a village in Dhofar Governorate, in southwestern Oman.
