= Euphorbia momccoyae =

- CITES Appendix II (CITES)

Scientific classification
- Kingdom: Plantae
- Clade: Tracheophytes
- Clade: Angiosperms
- Clade: Eudicots
- Clade: Rosids
- Order: Malpighiales
- Family: Euphorbiaceae
- Genus: Euphorbia
- Species: E. momccoyae

Binomial name
- Euphorbia momccoyae Lavranos

Species of flowering plant

Euphorbia momccoyae is a species of flowering plant in the family Euphorbiaceae. It is a succulent shrub found in the Dhofar Governorate, Oman, and the Hadhramaut Governorate, Yemen.

In the wild, Euphorbia momccoyae grows on limestone, typically occurring in small hills or flat areas, but occasionally also in steep vertical cliffs.
