= Sharbithat =

- Town
- Location in Oman
- Coordinates: 17°56′15″N 56°16′25″E
- Country: Oman
- Governorate: Dhofar Governorate
- Time zone: UTC+4 (+4)

Sharbithat (Arabic: شربيتات) is a coastal town in Dhofar, Oman. It is located at around 17°56′15″N 56°16′25″E, and is located in the wilayat of Sheleem. Sharbithat is situated around 430 km from Salalah, which is in the south of Sultanate of Oman.

== Characteristics ==
Sharbithat is a fishing village, having a population of approximately 300 people. Fish caught from Sharbithat is sent to places like Dubai and Salalah, among others, where it is packaged and exported. Sharbithat has a secondary school, health center and housing colony.

== Archeology ==
The 14-km coastline of Sharbithat is a promising site of excavation for Neolithic sites; the first dig was conducted in January 2017. In 2020, a tooth from a species of Otodus, an extinct genus of shark, dating back 5500 years was found. The tooth was the first of its kind found in Arabia.
