= Soqotrans =

Arabian Sea islander ethnic group

السقطريون
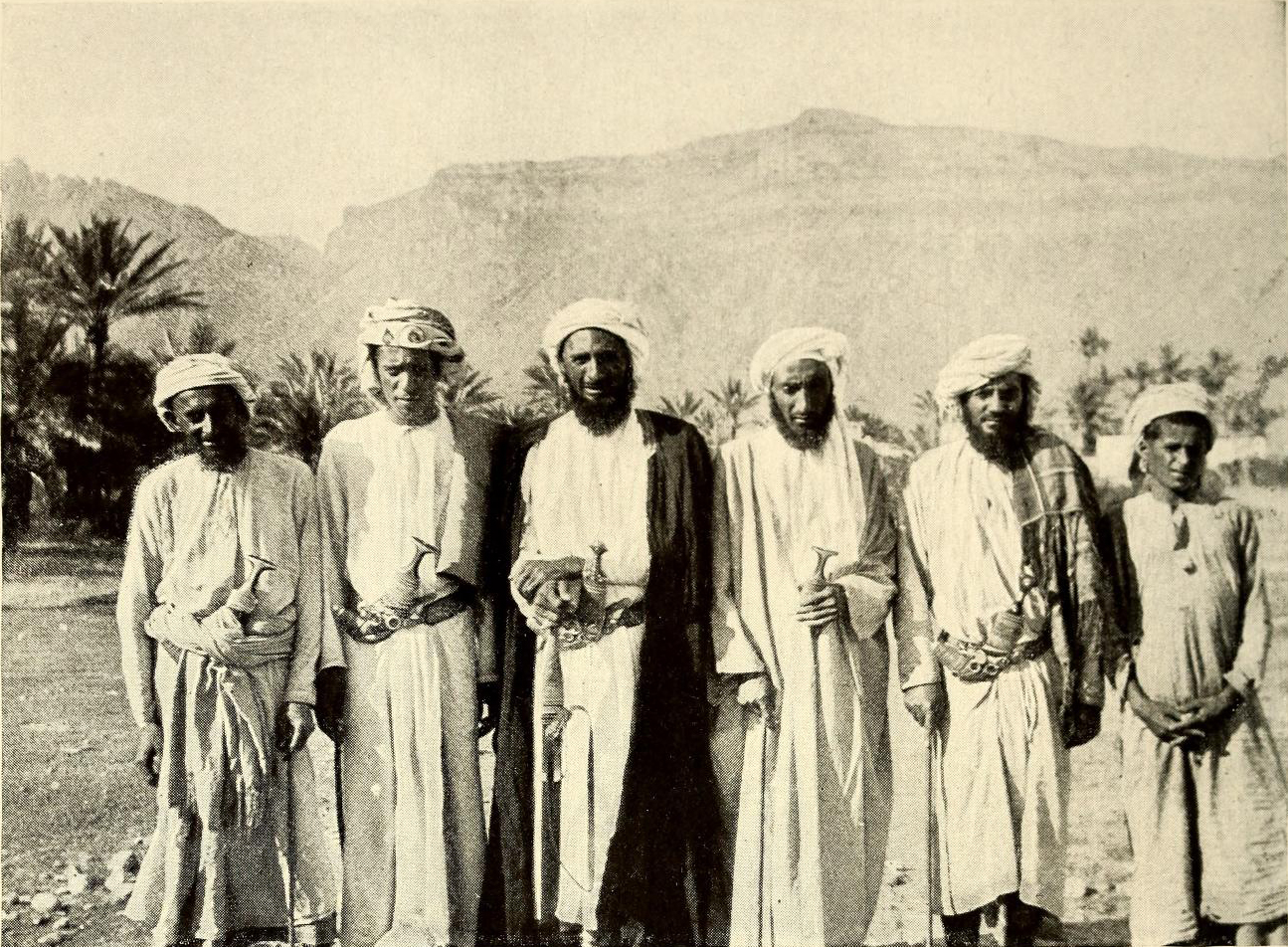
- Soqotri people, 1918

Total population
- 131,000

Regions with significant populations
- Yemen

Languages
- Soqotri and Yemeni Arabic

Religion
- Islam

Related ethnic groups
- Other Semitic-speaking peoples Especially Harasis, Mehri, and other Modern South Arabian-speaking peoples

Socotrans or Soqotrans are a South Arabian ethnographic group native to the Yemeni island of Socotra. They speak the Soqotri language, a Modern South Arabian language in the Afroasiatic family.

== General ==
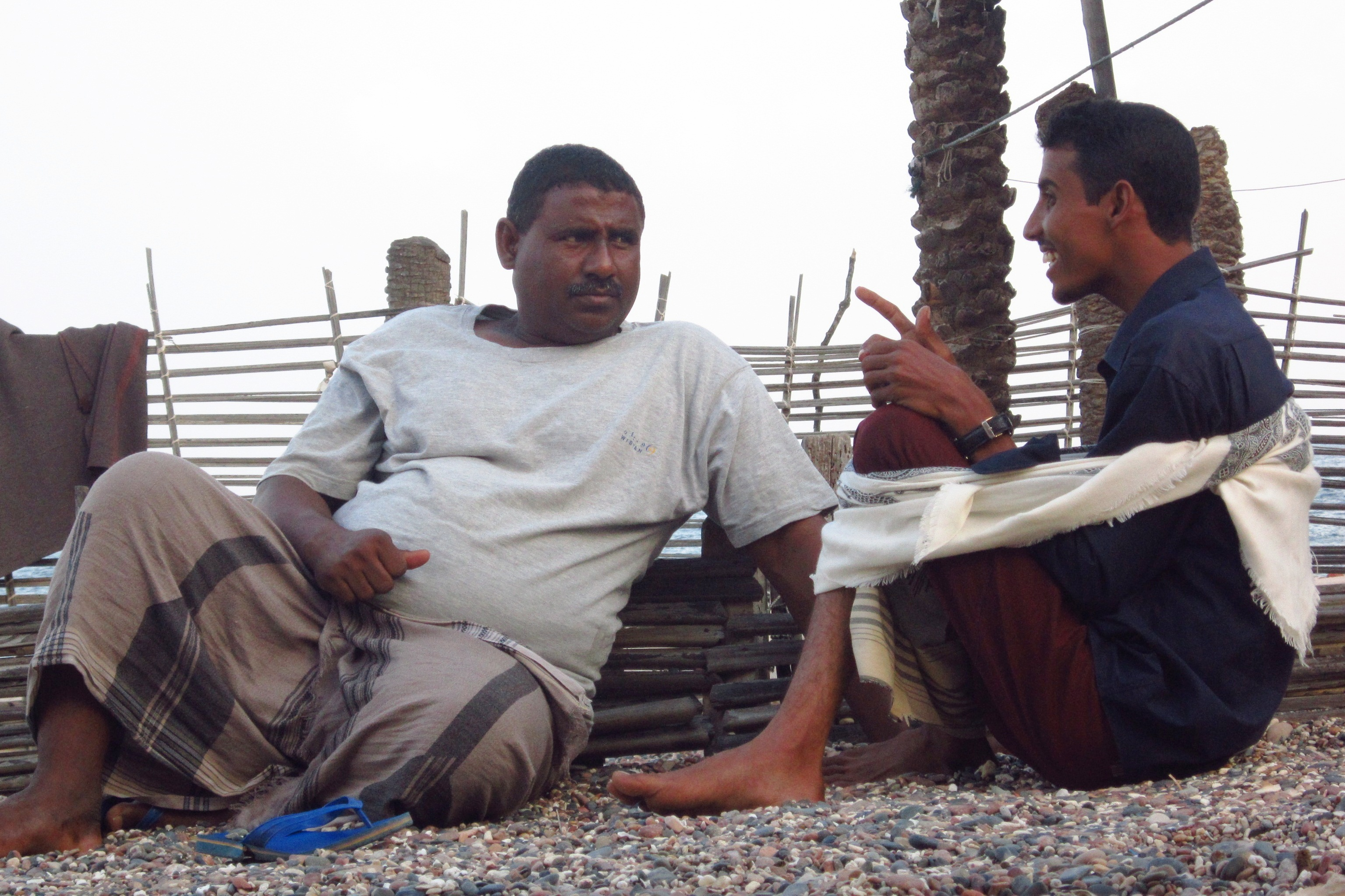
Soqotri men

The Soqotrans primarily inhabit the Socotra Archipelago, on Socotra island and the Abd al Kuri, Darsah and Samhah districts of the Amanat Al Asimah governorate, Yemen.

According to Ethnologue, there are an estimated 110,000 Soqotri speakers as of 2020. As of the 1990 Yemeni census of Socotra, they numbered around 57,000.

Most Soqotrans are Sunni Muslim. Historically, Soqotrans were Nestorian Christians, from the Christianization of the island between the 4th and 6th centuries up until the 15th century, when the island was occupied by the Mehri Sultanate in 1480. This led to the slow Islamisation of the Soqotrans.

== Language ==
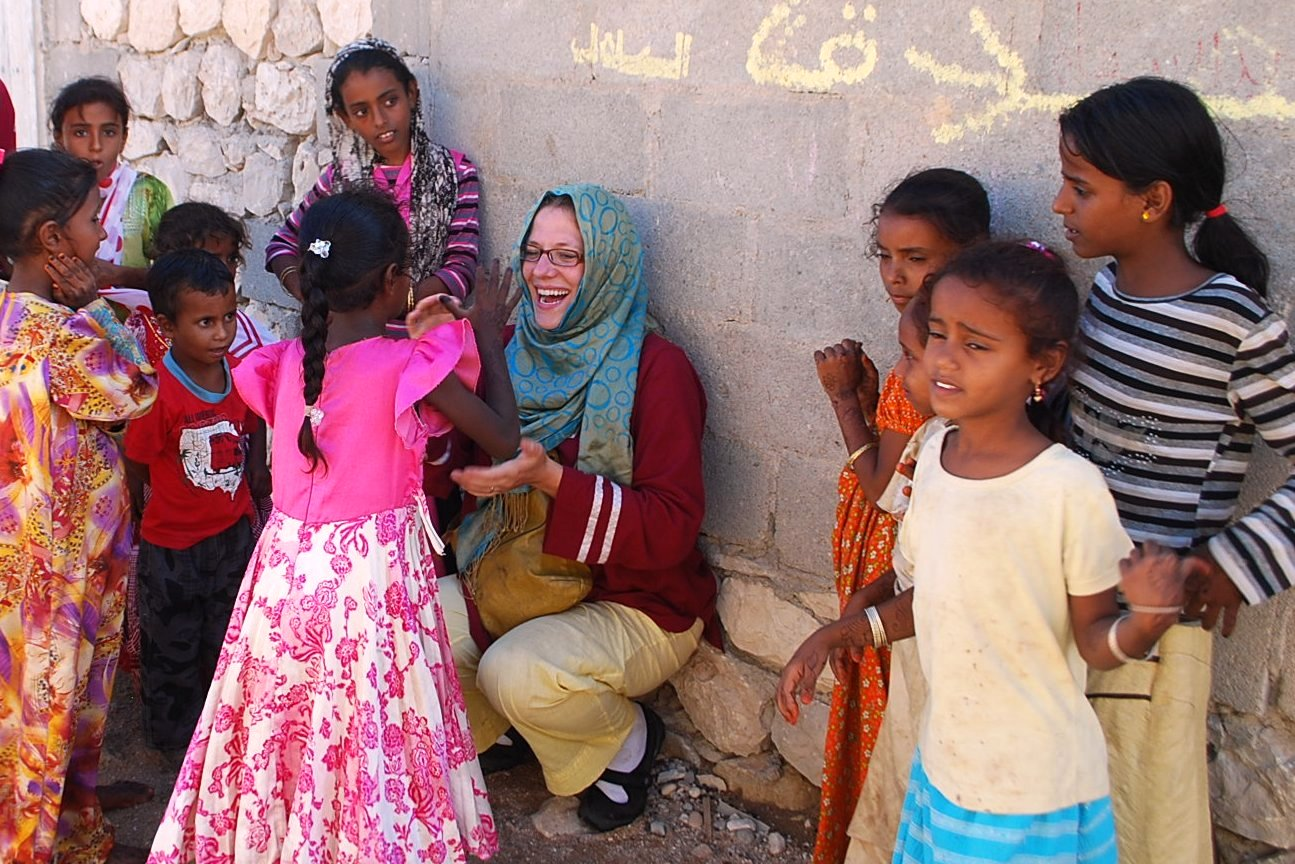
Soqotri girls in Qalansiya

The Soqotrans speak the Soqotri language (also known as Saqatri, Socotri, Sokotri and Suqutri). It belongs to the Modern South Arabian languages which are closer to the Ethiopian Semitic languages than to Arabic (Central Semitic languages). Despite historical contacts with the Arabic language, there is no mutual understanding between native speakers of the Modern South Arabian languages and native speakers of Arabic. Moreover, there is no mutual understanding between the speakers of the Modern South Arabian languages themselves, and the Soqotri language is only spoken on the island of Socotra.

Soqotri has several dialects, which consist of ’Abd Al-Kuri, Central Soqotri, Northern Soqotri, Southern Soqotri and Western Soqotri. North Soqotri comprises North Central and Northwest Central (highland) Soqotri.

The language is written using the Naskh variant of the Arabic script. Soqotri is also transcribed with the Latin script.

== Genetics ==
Most Soqotrans belong to the paternal haplogroup J, bearing the basal J*(xJ1,J2) clade at its highest frequencies (71.4%). The remaining individuals mainly carry the J1 subclade (14.3%). YFull and FTDNA however, failed to find J* people anywhere in the world although there are 2 J2-Y130506 persons and 1 J1 person from Soqotra Island.

Maternally, Soqotrans primarily belong to the haplogroups N (24.3% N*; 6.2% N1a) and R0 (17.8% R0a1b; 13.8% R0a; 6.2% R0a1). The basal N* clade occurs at its highest frequencies among them. The next most common mtDNA lineages borne by Soqotri individuals are the haplogroups J (9.2% J*; 3.1 J1b), T (7.7% T2; 1.2% T*), L3 (4.3% L3*), H (3.1%), and R (1.2 R*).

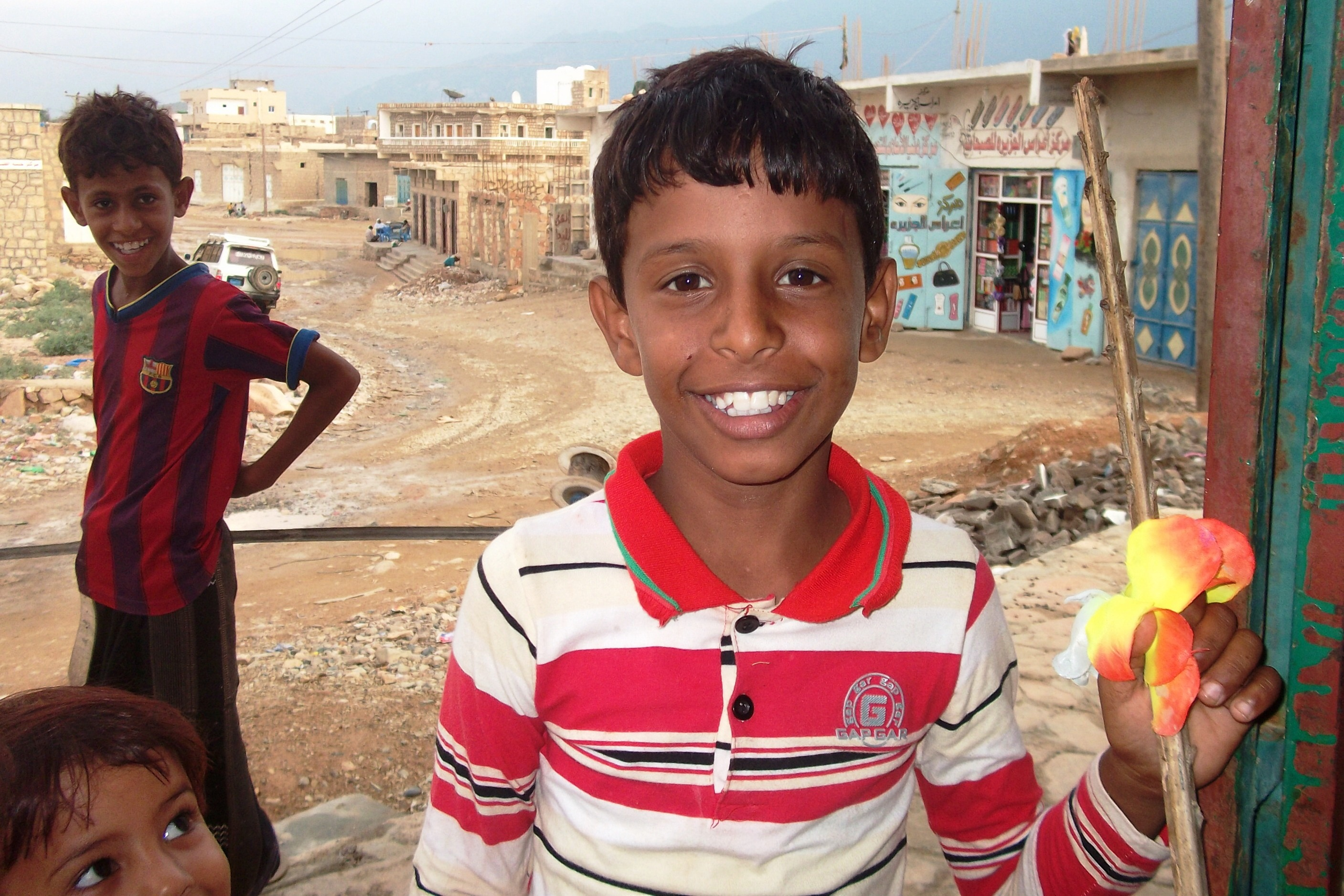
Group of boys from Hadiboh, on Soqotra island

A 2024 study sampled whole-genomes from 39 Soqotri inhabitants from 650-1750 CE, and found that the individuals had a strong genetic relation to Hadhrami Arabs, another Southern Arabian population. These Medieval Soqotri inhabitants were said to derive 86% of their ancestry from Arabs of the Hadramawt region in Yemen, with the Soqotri genome remaining stable over a millennium. The deep ancestry of both the Soqotra and Hadramawt groups was said to be similar to that of Natufians, rather than being from the later Levantine/Anatolian farmers.

Sirak et al. (2024) found that medieval Socotra (the Soqotri people), similar to modern Saudis, Yemenis and Bedouins, have a majority component that is "maximized in Late Pleistocene (Epipaleolithic) Natufian hunter–gatherers from the Levant".

== See also ==
- Mahra Sultanate
