= Hinawi =

Hinawi people
حناوي

Languages
- Harsusi, Mehri, Yemeni Arabic and Omani Arabic

Religion
- Islam

Related ethnic groups
- Other Semitic-speaking peoples Especially Soqotri, Ghafiri, Bedouins, Harasis, Mehri and other Modern South Arabian-speaking peoples

The Hinawi are one of two major tribal groupings of Oman and the Trucial States (today the United Arab Emirates), the other being the Ghafiri. Characterized as two significant factions having distinct interests and organizations, their rivalry began approximately 2000 years ago; coinciding with the Ghafiri arrival to Oman.

The Hinawis, for the most part, resided in southeast Oman, while the Ghafiris predominated in the northwestern part of Oman. Several tribal groups make up the Hinawi alliance, such as, the Dhawahir, Bani Yas, the Awamir, the Beni Hina and the Harasis.

During the 18th century, serious conflicts occurred between the two factions. These conflicts only ended after many sub-tribes were united under one leader that belonged to one of the two factions. The Hinawis gathered under Khalaf bin Mubarak Alhinai from the Bani Hina tribe, while the Ghafiris gathered under Mohammed bin Nasir Alghafiri of the Beni Ghafir tribe. The almost equal strength of the two alliances led to the end of the feud. The rivalry played a decisive role in shaping the political history of Oman, with Omani tribes affiliating themselves historically with either the Ghafiri or Hinawi alliances.

== History ==
Prior to the spread of Islam, there were two distinct groups in Oman, one was the Azd from southwestern Arabia, of which Ibadi Hinawi creeds align with, while the other was Nizari (Nejdi) from central and northern Arabia, of which the Sunni Ghafiri creeds align with. A segment of the Azd tribe migrated to Oman in 200 AD following the catastrophe caused by the failure of the Marib Dam in Yemen. Malik bin Fahm Alazdi was the first Yemeni settler in Oman. He first settled in Qalhat. Malik, with an armed force of more than 6000 men and horses, fought against Marzban of the Sasanian Empire in Oman in the battle of Salut, which he eventually won.

Election of the Imam of Oman in 8th century was secured by an agreement which included Hinawis and Ghafiris leadership. Frequent conflicts between the two groups came to the fore during the election of the Imamate in 1719, which was contested by one Hinawi and one Ghafiri candidate. The rivalry of the 18th century ended when the smaller tribes that constituted Ghafiris and Hinawis created almost equal in power alliances that resulted in peace. The rivalry ignited again during the 19th century but also ended after the two major tribes united under Imam Alkharusi in 1913 against British imperialism that started to develop in the Sultanate of Muscat. The conflict between the Imamate and the Sultanate ended with the signing of the Treaty of Seeb, which resulted in a stable Oman and Muscat during the period of 1920–54. Although feuds still persist, the outburst is generally limited in the present day to football rivalry between the teams of both confederations.

== Hinawi Federated Tribes ==
The following were recorded as Hinawi associated tribes in northern and central Oman:

- Al 'Awamir
- Al Harasis
- Al Hijariyin
- Al Hirth
- Al Wahibah
- Bani Hina

== Bibliography ==
- Asiatic Society (1877). Journal of the Asiatic Society of Bengal (Public domain ed.). Asiatic Society.
- Court of Arbitration at the Hague (1905). In the Permanent court of arbitration at The Hague: Grant of the French flag to Muscat Dhows. The case on behalf of the government of his Britannic majesty and of his highness the sultan of Muscat (Public domain ed.). London.
- Darke, Diana (2010). Oman: The Bradt Travel Guide. Bradt Travel Guides. ISBN 978-1-84162-332-0.
- Davies, Charles E. (1 January 1997). The Blood-red Arab Flag: An Investigation Into Qasimi Piracy, 1797-1820. University of Exeter Press. ISBN 978-0-85989-509-5.
- Maisel, Sebastian; Shoup, John A. (February 2009). Saudi Arabia and the Gulf Arab States Today: An Encyclopedia of Life in the Arab States. Greenwood Press. ISBN 978-0-313-34442-8.
- Stöckli, Sigrid (13 October 2011). National Entity - Tribal Diversity. GRIN Verlag. ISBN 978-3-656-02799-7.
- Valeri, Marc (2009). Oman: Politics and Society in the Qaboos State. Hurst Publishers. ISBN 978-1-85065-933-4.
