= Saadha =

Sadah
- Wilayat
- Location in Oman
- Country: Oman
- Governorate: Dhofar Governorate

Population (2017)
  - Total: 5,944
- Time zone: UTC+4 (+4)

Sadah (Arabic: سدح) is a coastal town 30–40 km from Salalah in the southern Omani governorate of Dhofar. There are a few supermarkets, shops, schools and colleges in the town, as well as a police station and a healthcare centre run by the Ministry of Health. Saadha is linked to the nearby towns of Taqa, Mirbat, and Thumrait by motorable roads.

== History ==
In 1908, J.G. Lorimer recorded Sadah in his Gazetteer of the Persian Gulf, noting its location as being on the coast east of Mirbat, roughly 20 miles or more from that place by land. He wrote:

A small village on the sea at the mouth of a wadi of the same name. There are 1 or 2 houses and about 20 caves, on both sides of the valley, inhabited by Qaras (Al-Hakli) of the Ahl 'Umr section.

The Wali of Dhufar formerly maintained a post of 15 'Askaris here, but it has been abolished; there are a few store-houses. The place depends on the frankincense trade. There are no boats except from other places. Cattle number 600 and goats and sheep 1,000.
