= Al Haffah =

Al Ḩāffah Ḩāfa
- Village
- Location in Oman
- Coordinates: 17°00′03″N 54°06′12″E
- Country: Oman
- Governorate: Dhofar Governorate
- Time zone: UTC+4 (Oman Standard Time)

Al Ḩāffah or simply Ḩāfa is a coastal village in Dhofar Governorate, in southwestern Oman. It lies just south of Salalah.

== History ==
In 1908, J. G. Lorimer recorded Al Haffah in his Gazetteer of the Persian Gulf, noting its location as being about 2 miles east of Salalah on the coast, along which it extends quarter of a mile. He wrote:

Village of 150 houses of stone and mud; some however are uninhabited. About 25 families are low caste fishermen; the rest are Al Kathir Arabs of the Shanafirah section. There are a few coconut gardens. There are no manufactures.
