= Volvarina dhofarensis =

Scientific classification
- Kingdom: Animalia
- Phylum: Mollusca
- Class: Gastropoda
- Subclass: Caenogastropoda
- Order: Neogastropoda
- Family: Marginellidae
- Subfamily: Marginellinae
- Genus: Volvarina
- Species: V. dhofarensis

Binomial name
- Volvarina dhofarensis Boyer, 2015

Species of gastropod

Volvarina dhofarensis is a species of sea snail, a marine gastropod mollusk in the family Marginellidae, the margin snails.

== Description ==
The length of the shell attains 26.6 mm, its diameter is 11.9 mm.

== Distribution ==
This marine species occurs off Dhofar Governorate, in Oman in the Arabian Sea.
