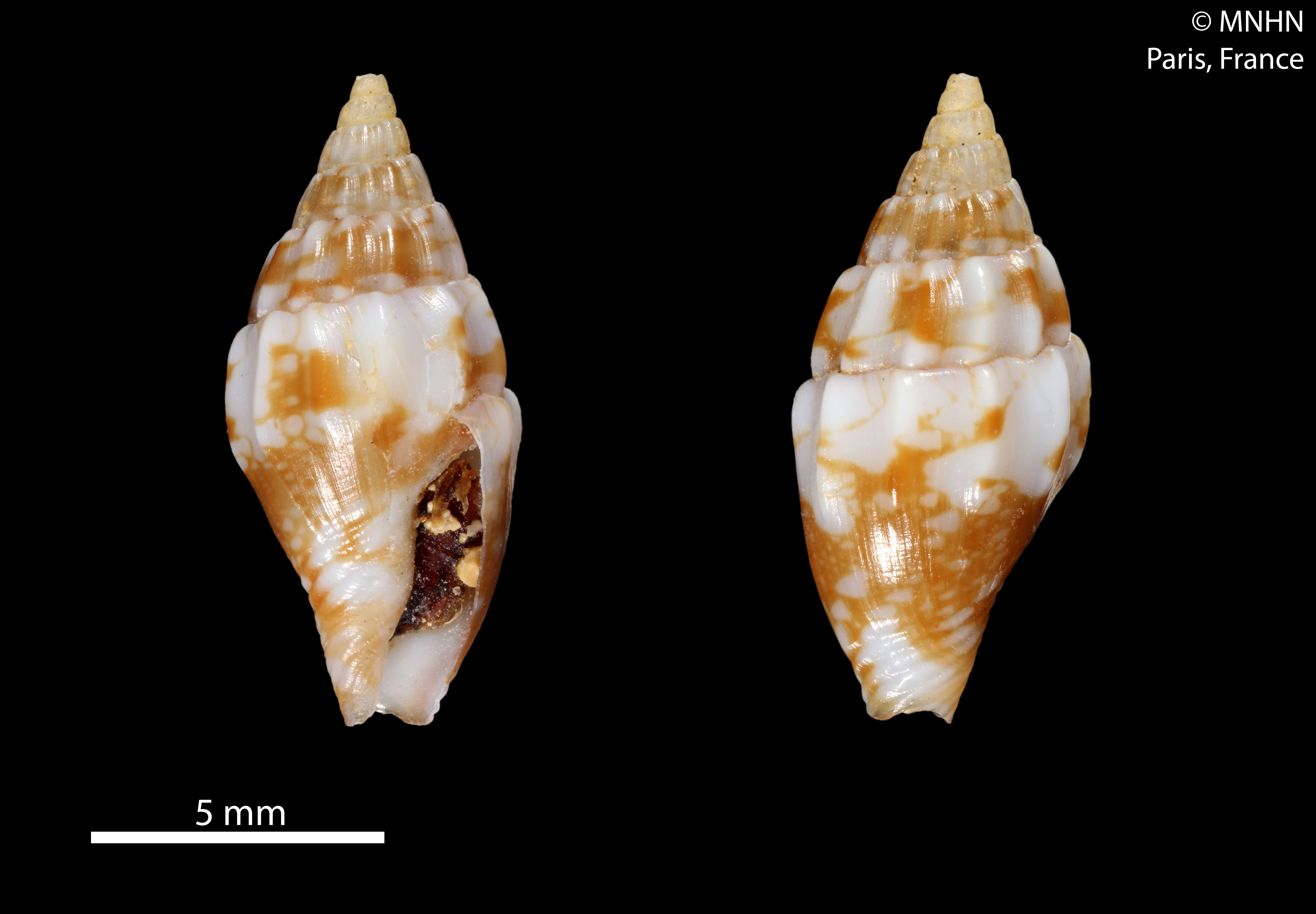
- Shell of Anachis raysutana (paratype at MNHN, Paris)

Scientific classification
- Kingdom: Animalia
- Phylum: Mollusca
- Class: Gastropoda
- Subclass: Caenogastropoda
- Order: Neogastropoda
- Family: Columbellidae
- Genus: Anachis
- Species: A. raysutana

Binomial name
- Anachis raysutana Smythe, 1985

= Anachis raysutana =

Species of gastropod

Anachis raysutana is a species of sea snail in the family Columbellidae, the dove snails.

== Distribution ==
This species occurs off Dhofar.
