= Rism =

- Hamlet
- Location in Oman
- Coordinates: 17°08′10″N 54°05′31″E
- Country: Oman
- Governorate: Dhofar Governorate
- Time zone: UTC+4 (Oman Standard Time)

Rism is a hamlet in Dhofar Governorate, in southwestern Oman.
