= Ghafiri =

Ghafiri people
غفيري

Languages
- Mehri, Yemeni Arabic and Omani Arabic

Religion
- Islam

Related ethnic groups
- Other Semitic-speaking peoples Especially Soqotri, Harasis, Bedouins, Hinawi, Mehri and other Modern South Arabian-speaking peoples

The Ghafiri (also Ghafiri or al-Ghafiriyah) are one of two major tribal confederations of Oman and the Trucial States (today the United Arab Emirates), the other being the Hinawi. Both confederations claim their origin to the Bedouin tribe and the Ghafiri also trace their roots to the Nizari or Adnani tribes.

Both groups provided support to the ruling sultans to further their own interests. The Ghafiri are a mixture of Ibadhi and Sunni Muslims.

== History ==
The Ghafiri confederation of the Ibadi Imamate was established in the mid 8th century. In the election of a new imam (leader) who functioned as "both temporal and religious leader of the community", the leaders of both confederations played an important role in governance. The confederations played a role in the political history of Oman, with Omani tribes being affiliated with one or the other confederation. Because of the Ghafiri's support of Saif ibn Sultan II, a clash occurred between the two confederations in 1748 in which leaders of both tribes died.

In the late 19th century, Ghafiri, numbering approximately 20,000 people, lived in the areas of Buraimi and Su'areb. Ghafiri tribes of that time were the Na'im, the Beni Ka'ib, the Beni Kattab, Bani Omar and Daramikeh. A constant feature of the rivalry of the two groups was also witnessed in the support they provided to the ruling sultans to further their own interests. During the conflicts between the two groups and the rivalry of the imam and the sultan, the British eventually played an intermediary role, and this resulted in a stable Sultanate in Oman which lasted between 1920 and 1954.

== Culture ==
Many of the Ghafiri's religious affiliation is Sunni Muslim, abiding by the Wahhabi tenets , whilst others such as the Banu Riyam, are Ibadhi. The Na'im are Ghafiri by political affiliation. Although rivalry continues in the modern day between Ghafiri and Hinawis, it is generally limited to their opposing football teams.
