= Ḥarsusi language =

Semitic language spoken in Oman

Harsusi
- Harsiyyet
- Pronunciation: [ħʌrsiːjət]
- Native to: Oman
- Region: Jiddat al-Harasis, Dhofar Province
- Native speakers: 600 (2011)
- Language family: Afro-Asiatic: Semitic; West Semitic; South Semitic; Southeast Semitic; Harsusi

Language codes
- ISO 639-3: hss
- Glottolog: hars1241
- ELP: Ḥarsusi

- Ḥarsusi is classified as "definitely endangered" by the UNESCO Atlas of the World's Languages in Danger

Ḥarsūsī (Arabic: لغة حرسوسية), natively known as Ḥersīyet (pronunciation in Harsusi: [ħʌrsiːjət]), is a Semitic language of Oman, spoken by the Harasis people. It is classified as a moribund language, with an estimated 600-1000 speakers in Jiddat al-Harasis, a stony desert in south-central Oman. It is closely related to Mehri.

== General information ==
Harsusi first came to the attention of outside scholars in 1937, when it was mentioned by Bertram Thomas in his book Four Strange Tongues of South Arabia. While certain scholars have claimed that Harsusi is a dialect of the more widely spoken Mehri language, most maintain that they are mutually intelligible but separate languages. Harsusi, like all the Modern South Arabian languages, is unwritten, though there have been recent efforts to create a written form using an Arabic-based script.

Because the Harasis people were for centuries the only human inhabitants of Jiddat al-Harasis, the language developed in relative isolation. However, as most Harasis children now attend Arabic-language schools and are literate in Arabic, Harsusi is spoken less in the home, meaning that it is not being passed down to future generations. Though the discovery of oil in the area and the conservation project for the re-introduced oryx herd have provided many job opportunities for Harsusi men, these factors have also caused many Harasis to speak Arabic and Mehri in addition to or in place of Harsusi. Harry Stroomer wrote that it was "probably extinct" These pressures led one researcher to conclude in 1981 that "within a few generations Harsusi will be replaced by Arabic, more specifically by the Omani Arabic standard dialect" though this has not yet materialized.

UNESCO has categorised Harsusi as a language that is "definitely endangered".

== Phonology ==
=== Consonants ===
Harsusi consonants
		Labial	Dental		Lateral	Post- alveolar	Velar	Uvular	Pharyngeal	Glottal
		Labial	median	sibilant	Lateral	Post- alveolar	Velar	Uvular	Pharyngeal	Glottal
Nasal		m				n				
Plosive	voiceless		t				k			ʔ
Plosive	voiced	b	d				ɡ			
Plosive	emphatic		tˤ				kʼ			
Fricative	voiceless	f	θ	s	ɬ	ʃ		χ	ħ	h
Fricative	voiced		ð	z				ʁ	(ʕ)	
Fricative	emphatic		ðˤ	sˤ	ɬˤ	ʃˤ				
Rhotic			r							
Semivowel					l	j	w			

The pharyngeal consonant /ʕ/ only exists possibly because of the influence of Omani Arabic.

/ɬˤ/ may frequently be voiced as [ɮˤ] when in intervocalic positions.

The voiceless palato-alveolar emphatic fricative /ʃˤ/ does not occur in many words in Harsusi.

=== Vowels ===
Harsusi vowels
	Front	Central	Back
Close	i iː		u uː
Mid	e eː	ə	o oː
Open	a aː		

In prominent open syllables or after a guttural (such as /h/, /ħ/, /x/ and /ɣ/), /ə/ is realized as [ʌ]. After a glottalized or lateral fricative consonant, /ə/ is realized as [ä].

Diphthongs may be realized as ay /æj/ and aw /ɑw/.
