= Shuwaymiya mine =

Gypsum mine in Dhofar Governorate, Oman

- Location: Dhofar Governorate, Oman
- Products: Gypsum

The Shuwaymiya mine is one of the largest gypsum mines in Oman. The mine is located outside the small fishing village of Shuwaymiya (الشويمية) in the southeast of the Dhofar Governorate. The mine has reserves amounting to 165 million tonnes of gypsum. Construction of the Shuwaymiya Industrial Minerals Complex was said to have begun in 2024, where it will be open to commercial operation in 2027. 3 quarries over a 1,500 square kilometer area will produce 40 million tons of limestone, dolomite, and gypsum every year. A port in Shuwaymiya will also be constructed.
