= Harasis =

Hinawi bedouin tribe of Oman

Harasis people
الهاراسيس

Total population
- 2,000

Languages
- Harsusi, Mehri, Yemeni Arabic and Omani Arabic

Religion
- Islam

Related ethnic groups
- Other Semitic-speaking peoples Especially Soqotri, Ghafiri, Bedouins, Hinawi, Mehri and other Modern South Arabian-speaking peoples

Harasis is the Hinawi Bedouin tribe of Oman. They arrived in the Jiddat al-Harasis desert of Dhofar Governorate in the late 19th century. Harasis people (about 1000–2000 people) in the Jiddat al-Harasis are reported to be of different identity compared to the Bedu nomads.

They speak the Ḥarsusi language; though they are reported to be increasing their use of the Mehri language, which is more dominant in the area, and are bilingual in Arabic.
