= Jiddat al-Harasis =

Desert in Oman

Coordinates: 19°47′N 55°51′E

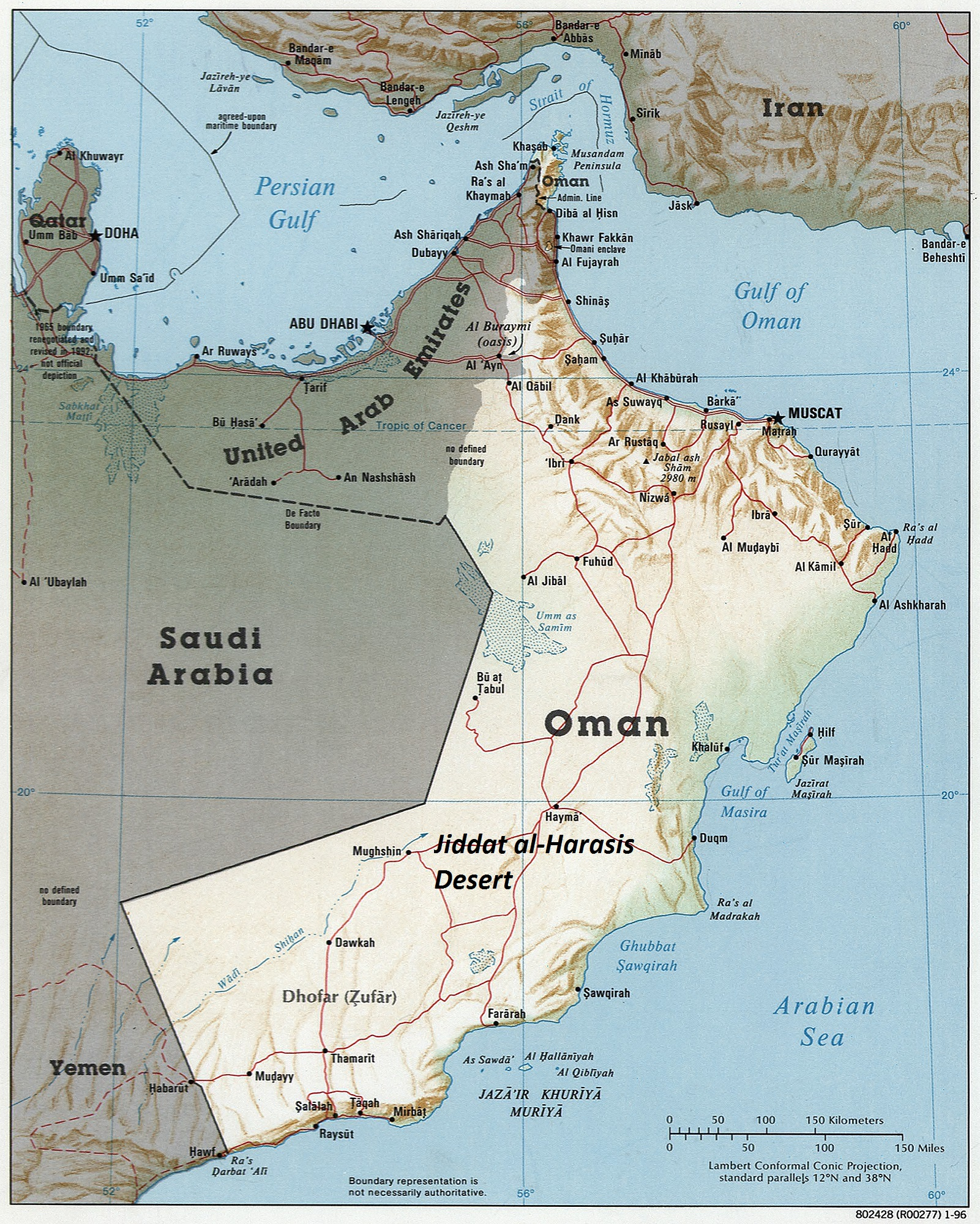
Location in Oman

Jiddat al-Harasis (Jiddat-il-Harasiis) is a stony desert in south-central Oman, separating northern Oman from Dhufar. The largest strewn field of meteorites in the country is situated here. Over 160 bird species, including the endangered houbara bustard, are found here, as well as Arabian oryx and Arabian gazelle. The area was not permanently inhabited until the 19th century with the arrival of the Harasis.

== Geography ==
Jiddat al-Harasis covers an area of about 27,000 square kilometres (10,000 sq mi) in an elevation range of 100–150 metres (330–490 ft). The area is delimited by an escarpment of 100 metres (330 ft) height on the east with the Huquf depression adjoining it. This area is hemmed between the Arabian Sea and the Janabah Hills, which rise to a height of 300 metres (980 ft). The Arabian Sea forms Jiddat's eastern and southern borders. The geology is predominantly Miocene karst limestone. Older geological features include 300 million year old glacial pavements which are well preserved given their age.

=== Climate ===
The Southwest Monsoon and coastal fog both occur at Jiddat al-Harasis; the average annual rainfall in the southeastern region is approximately 50 millimetres (2.0 in). Rainfall, which is low, occurs during the monsoon season from June to October. Due to foggy conditions, humidity is noted to rise in the area. The desertic climate has summer (May to October) temperatures above 30 °C (86 °F) with July recording a high mean temperature of 34 °C (93 °F). During winter months the temperatures drops to 15 °C (59 °F). Fog moisture and dew cause rain during the nights, particularly during the months of October to April. This precipitation sustains vegetation and wildlife in the area, despite very low rainfall throughout the year.

=== Meteorites ===
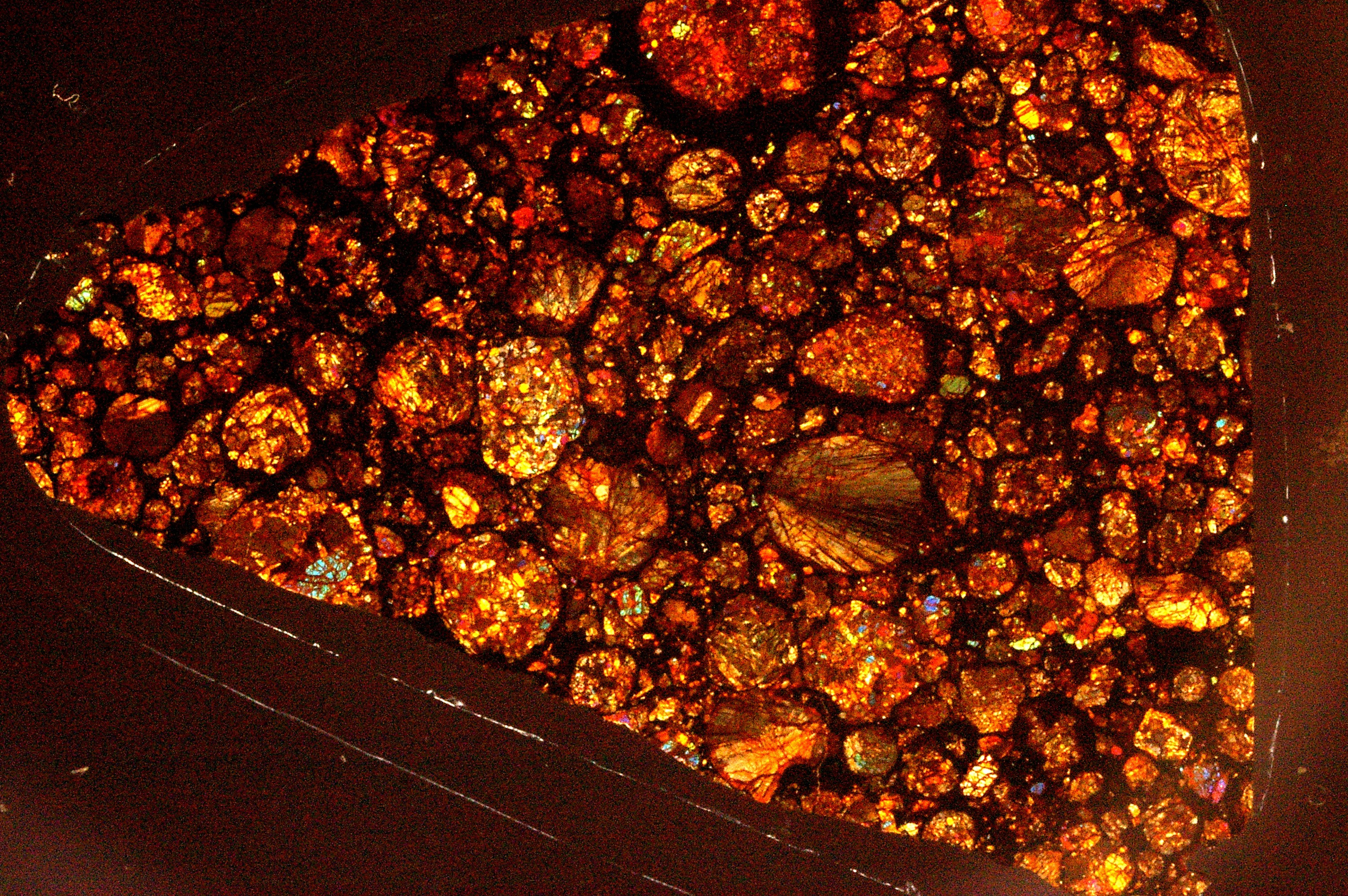
A thin section of a meteorite found in the Jiddat al-Harasis

Oman is one of the rare places on Earth where a number of lunar meteorites have been found. The largest strewn field of meteorites in the country is situated in Jiddat al-Harasis. According to the Meteoritical Bulletin of the International Society for Meteorites and Planetary Science there are 3,116 recorded meteorites from Oman out of which 1,385 are in Jiddat al-Harasis area; 41 approved meteorites are classified as lunar meteorites. The Jiddat al-Harasis 348 sample found in 2006, was recovered at Al Wusta in Jiddat weighing 18.4 g, a lunar feldspathic fragmental breccia. It is described as a "complete stone with no remaining fusion crust". The fragments of Martian meteorite Jiddat al-Harasis 479 are embedded in the Swiss Louis Moinet Meteoris wristwatches.

== Flora ==
Jiddat al-Harasis has "pseudo-savannah" vegetation with Acacia trees growing in the desert washes and occasional herbs and shrubs outside the washes. The vegetation is sparse and limited to areas where sand has accumulated and rock gaps. Common trees are Acacia tortilis and Acacia ehrenbergiana associated with ghaf (Prosopis cineraria); the trees are important shade plants for the Arabian oryx. Low shrubs and ephemeral grasses are sparsely distributed. Shrubs recorded are Tephrosia apollinea, Crotalaria aegyptiaca and Ochradenus harsusiticus which is an endemic species. Many species of grass, including Lycium shawii, and species of Zygophyllum and Stipagrostis also grow there. Lichen (Ramalina duriaei) grow on the dead branches of trees. The desert grades into Arabian sand dunes along the cold water coastal zone.

== Fauna ==
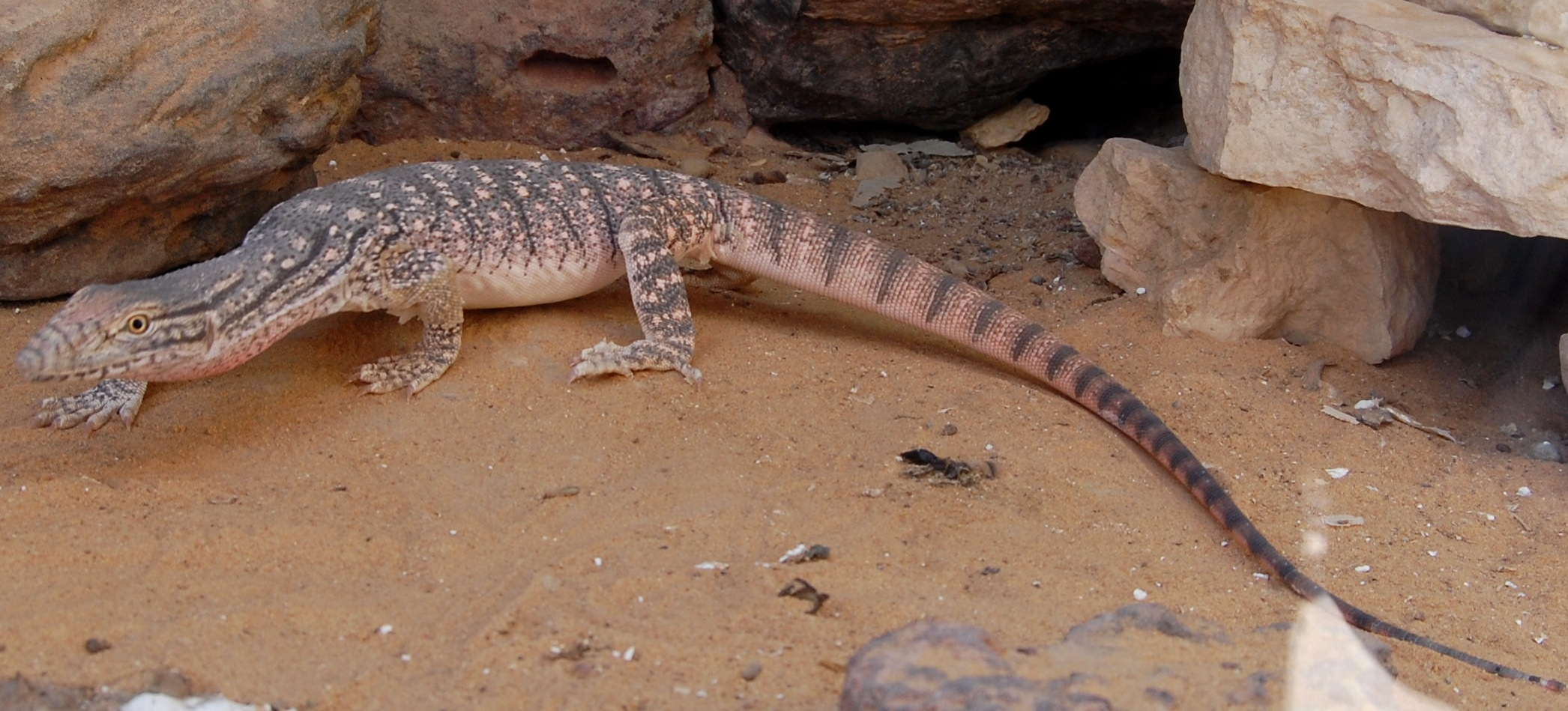
The gray monitor lizard is found in Jiddat al-Harasis

The Arabian oryx (Oryx leucoryx) lived in Jiddat al-Harasis until 1972 when it was considered extinct in the wild. In 1981 the San Diego Wild Animal Park, now the San Diego Zoo Safari Park, sent five oryxes to the Oman Mammal Breeding Center (also known as Yalooni, where they were released into the wild. Five years later, the International Union for Conservation of Nature (IUCN) proposed a national nature reserve in a section measuring 27,500 km^{2} (10,600 sq mi). The Arabian oryx population at this site reached a high of 450 in 1996 but later dwindled due to poaching and habitat destruction; as of 2007 only 65 individuals were identified, including only four breeding pairs, making the future viability of this wild population uncertain.

Other species recorded throughout are caracal, African wildcat and honey badger; hares and hedgehogs are common, while the Arabian wolf is rare. Arabian red fox (Vulpes vulpes arabica), Rüppell's sand fox (Vulpes rueppellii) and Nubian ibex are also reported. Reptile species recorded are grey monitor lizard, Uromastyx species, horned viper, carpet viper, false cobra, sand snake Psammophis longifrons, cat snake, skinks, agamids, and geckos. Rodents are also present.

Bird species comprise 22 breeding species, 15 migratory species and 104 migrant bird species; the latter are noted during spring and autumn season including the endangered houbara bustard in the regions where saline and brackish springs exist. Resident and migrating waders, gulls (Larus sp.), terns, flamingoes (Phoenicopterus spp.), herons and many species of duck are seen during the winter season in the lagoons bordering Jiddat al-Harasis .
