= Dhofar =

Governorate of Oman

Dhofar ظفار (Arabic)
- Governorate
- Dhofar Governorate
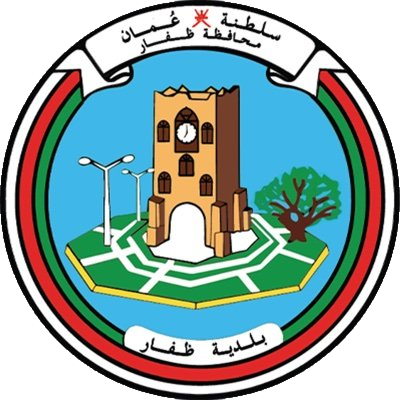
- Seal

- Map of Oman with the Dhofar Governorate highlighted
- Coordinates: 18°00′N 54°00′E
- Capital: Salalah
- Wilayat (districts): 10

Government
  - Governor: HH Marwan bin Turki Al Said

Area
  - Total: 99,300 km^{2} (38,300 sq mi)

Population (September 2021)
  - Total: 408,419
  - Density: 4.11/km^{2} (10.7/sq mi)
- Demonym: Dhofari
- Postal code: 211
- ISO 3166 code: OM-ZU
- Website: www.dm.gov.om

Dhofar (Arabic: ظُفَّار, romanized: Ẓuffār) is the largest of the 11 governorates in the Sultanate of Oman by area. It lies in southwestern Oman, bordered on the west by Al Mahrah Governorate of Yemen, on the north by the Eastern Province of Saudi Arabia, on the east by Al Wusta Governorate, and on the south by the Arabian Sea, part of the Indian Ocean. It is a rather mountainous area that covers 99,300 km^{2} (38,300 sq mi) and had a population of 416,458 in the 2020 census. Salalah is the largest city and capital of the governorate. Historically, the region was a source of frankincense. The local dialect of Arabic is Dhofari Arabic, which is distinct from that used in the rest of Oman and in Yemen. Many people in Dhofar also speak Modern South Arabian languages.

== History ==
=== Archaeology ===
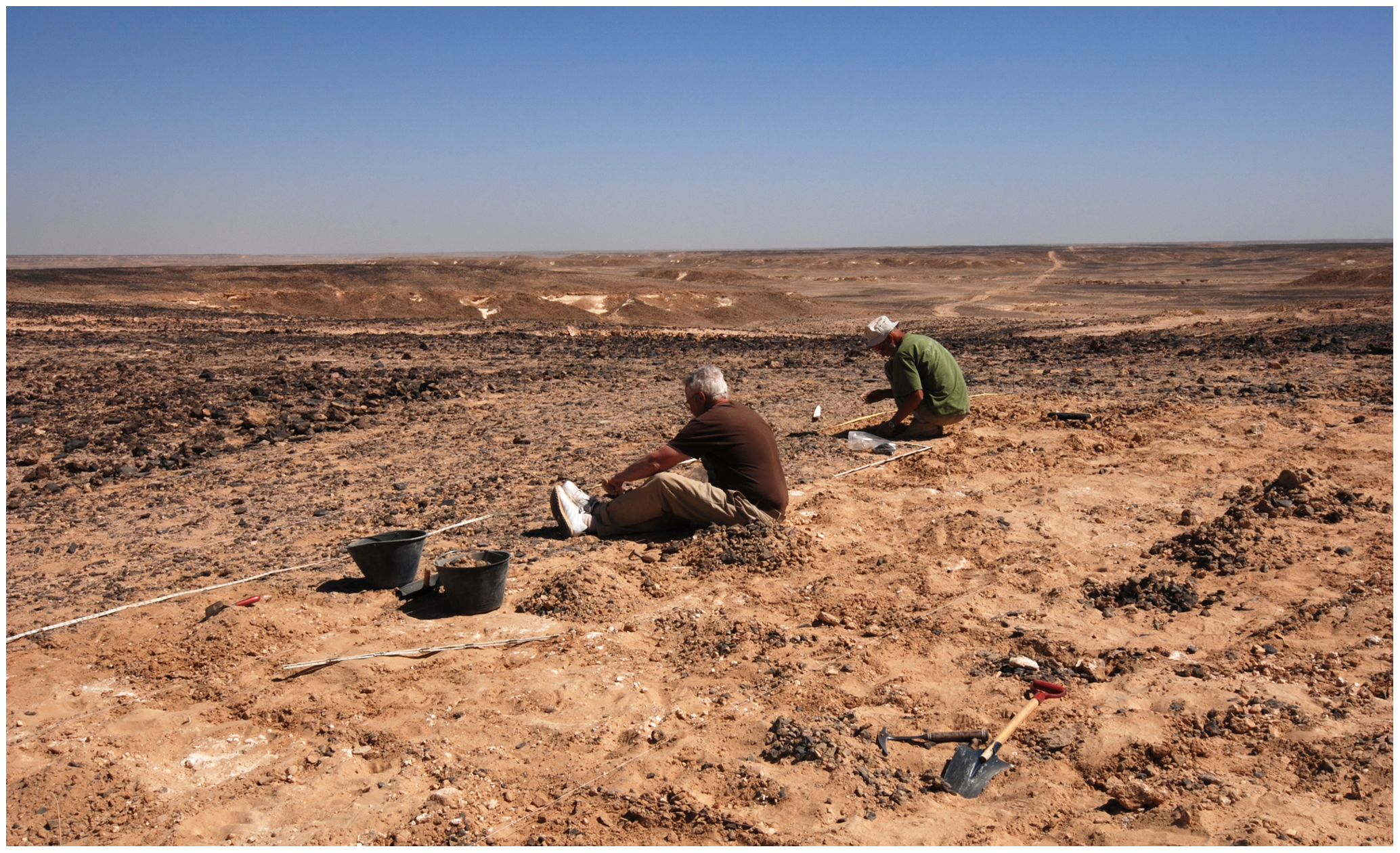
Archaeologists excavating a Middle Stone Age complex

At Aybut Al-Auwal ("First Aybut") in Wadi Aybut (west-central Nejd), a site was discovered in 2011 containing more than 100 surface scatters of stone tools belonging to a regionally specific lithic industry, the late Nubian Complex, known previously only from Northeast Africa. Two optically stimulated luminescence age estimates place the Arabian Nubian Complex at 106,000 years old. This provides evidence for a distinct Middle Stone Age technocomplex in southern Arabia around the earlier part of the Marine Isotope Stage 5. Bronze Age sites of the Dhofar Survey include tomb complexes found at Hodor (al-Hudfir).

=== Antiquity ===
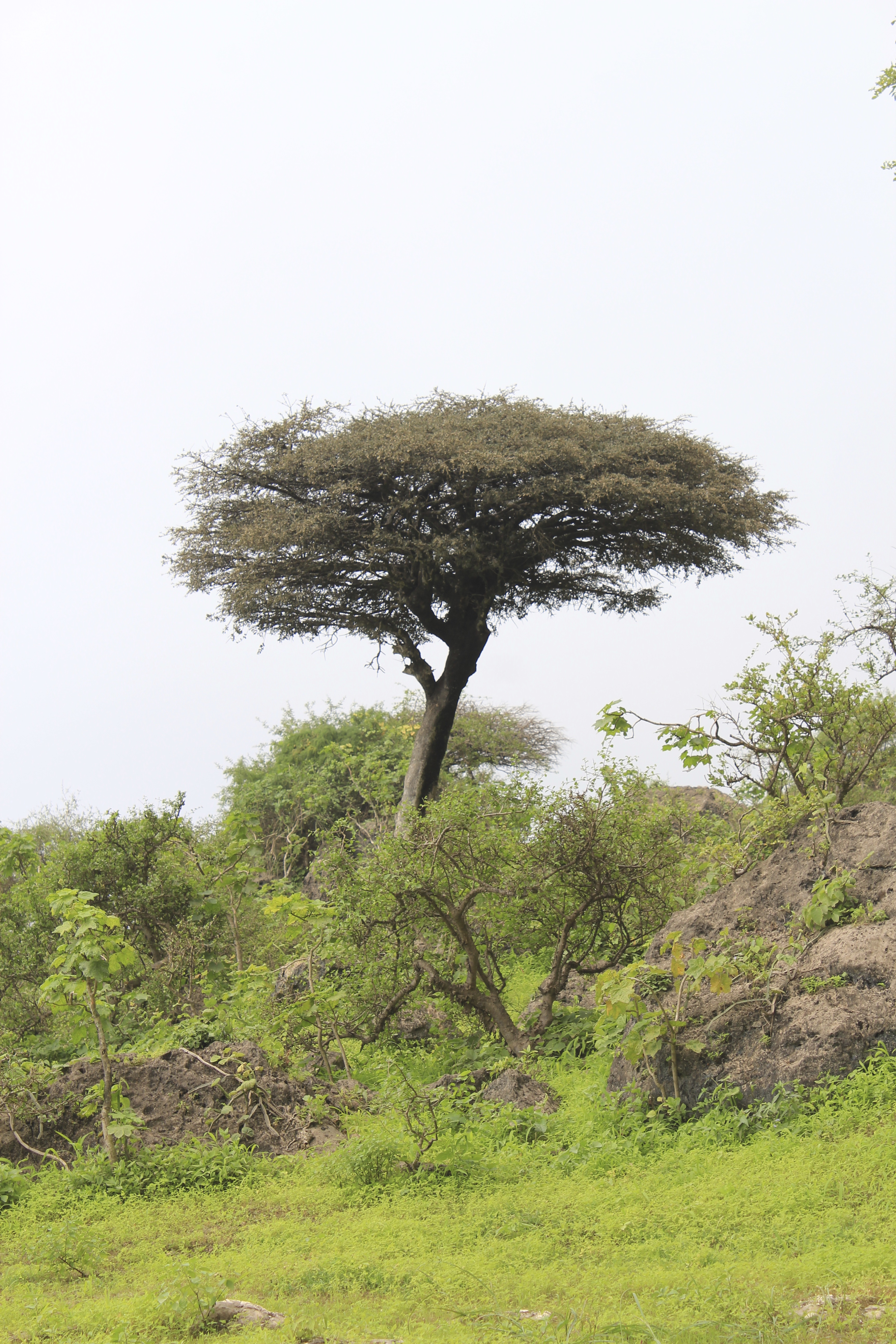
A tall frankincense tree (Boswellia sacra) stands out among the scenery

Dhofar was a major exporter of frankincense in ancient times, with some of it being traded as far as China.

Al-Baleed (also spelled Al Blaid), an area near Salalah which contains numerous archeological finds, used to serve as the home of the Manjawi Civilization from the 12th to 16th centuries.

The Shahri people are believed to be the original inhabitants of Dhofar.

=== Middle Ages ===
Venetian merchant Marco Polo wrote of Dhofar in The Travels of Marco Polo (c. 1300), stating:

Dufar is a great and noble and fine city. The people are Saracens [Muslims] and have a Count for their chief who is subject to the Soldan [Sultan] of Aden. Much white incense is produced here, and I will tell you how it grows. The trees are like small fir trees; these are notched with a knife in several places, and from these notches the incense is exuded. Sometimes it flows from the tree without any notch; this is by reason of the great heat of the sun there. This Dhafar is supposed to be the Sephar of Genesis, x. 30.

Prior to Omani rule, Dhofar was part of the sultanate of Kathiri, and was later mostly controlled by the tribes of Al-Hakli (Qara), thus given the name "Qara Mountain Range".

=== 19th century ===
In the early 19th century, the region was ruled by Muhammed Aqil and an American locally known as Abdullah Lorleyd and relied on the Mahra for support, but remained loyal to the sultans of Muscat.

A historical political précis on Dhofar produced by the British Government indicate that in 1876, a man named Sayyid Fadhl bin Alawi, who had arrived in Dhofar from Mecca in August 1875, had established himself as the de facto ruler of Dhofar. He claimed allegiance to the Ottomans, however, it was unknown if he was acting under their directive. With the help of Dhofari tribes he carried out warfare against the Bedouins of the interior. He was expelled by local sheikhs in January 1879.

=== 20th century ===
Dhofar is extensively detailed in the 1917 publication Gazetteer of Arabia, produced by the Government in British India and mostly based on information gathered by J.G. Lorimer's in his 1908 and 1915 handbook Gazetteer of the Persian Gulf, Oman and Central Arabia. In it, Dhofar's boundaries are given as between the Samhan hills (Jebel Samhan) and the sea, from Ra's Risut eastwards for 30 miles to Khor Rori. Colloquially, the term Dhofar was used to describe the villages of Al Haffah and Salalah, which housed about two-thirds of Dhofar's population at that time; however, on an official capacity, the term was understood to refer to the entire region of Dhofar, much like in the modern sense. Dhofar's physical geography was noted as consisting mainly of barren plains, a mountain range and several valleys, the most important of which was Wadi Raikut.

Communication outside of Dhofar was made difficult on account of the rugged landscape and the fact that no large harbors existed on the coast, though Mirbat and Risut were said to offer good anchorage for smaller vessels. The mountain paths were, for all intents and purposes, inaccessible during the rainy season. Aside from camels, no other transport animals were widely used. Frankincense was said to comprise the bulk of economic trade, with 9,000 cwt. being sent to Mumbai annually. Other exports were hides, sheep-skins, gums and beeswax. Among the chief imports were khat (which was mistaken for tobacco) from Mukalla and rice, sugar, dates and cloths from Mumbai.

Gordon Noel Jackson's 1943 essay on Dhofar provides a historical glimpse into the administration of the region:

The administration of the Dhufar Province is in the hands of the Sultan of Muscat himself. He appears to regard Dhufar more as a private estate than as a Province of his Sultanate and maintains a separate treasury. According to an article published some 65 years ago in the Nehla, a superior Arabic magazine of the last century, Sayyid Turki, the present Sultan's grandfather, established his rule there at the invitation of the Sayyids of Salalah to forestall the unwelcome interest of the Turks. He entrusted the task of establishing Muscat authority to one Sulaiman bin Suwailim, a former slave, and supplied him with a small body of soldiers to secure the towns from the tribesmen. Sulaiman bin Suwailim built a fort on the site of the present palace which was later seized and looted by the Kathiri, but it was not long before Muscat authority was re-established. His father took little interest in the Province but Sayyid Said bin Taimur, the present Sultan, has now been in residence there for over a year, has a trained agricultural adviser and an engineer with him and is making great strides in developing the agricultural resources.

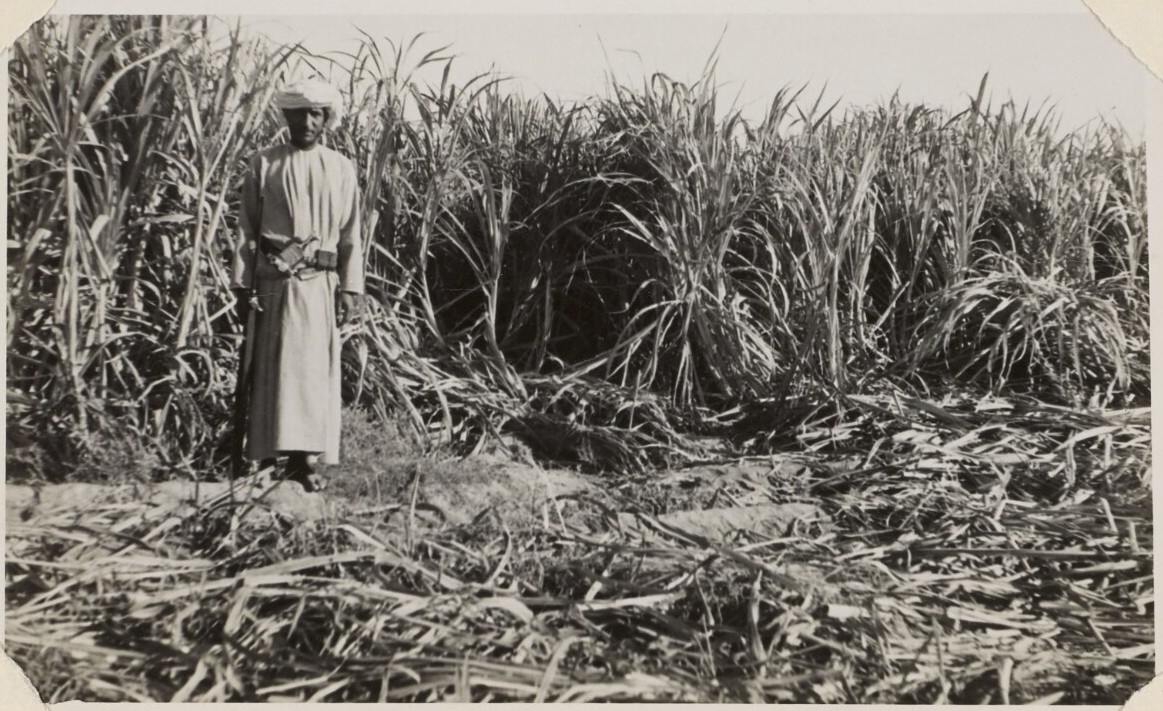
Sugar cane grown using the Rizat irrigation system in Dhofar Governorate, dated 1948

During World War I it was fertile enough to produce food and grain to supply a large proportion of the requirement of the British Army fighting in Mesopotamia.

A counter-insurgency campaign—the Omani Civil War (1963-76)—was fought here by the Sultan of Oman's Armed Forces against guerrilla fighters of the nationalist Dhofar Liberation Front and later the Marxist Popular Front for the Liberation of Oman and the Persian Gulf (PFLOAG). This latter group was supported by Communist South Yemen and several other socialist states, including East Germany. It aimed to depose the Sultan's government, who was assisted by the United Kingdom, Iran, and officers and doctors from Pakistan and India. The rebellion failed, and once the campaign was declared over in December 1975, the active remainder of PFLOAG forces surrendered.

== Geography ==
=== Topography ===
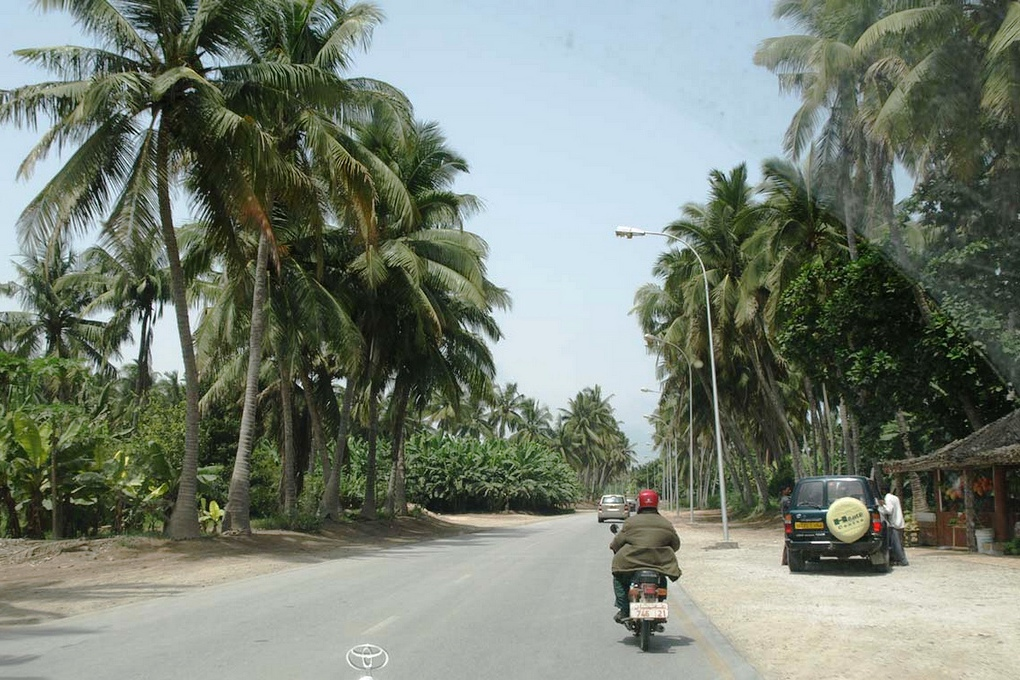
Coconut trees in the coastal area of Salalah

The Dhofar Governorate, situated in the western extremity of Oman's territories, is enclosed by the Indian Ocean on its southern side and by the Dhofar Mountains, a semi-circular formation of mountains running into the sea at Ras Hamar and Mirbat, which shut it off from the mountains and deserts to the north, east and west. South-west monsoon (locally referred to as Khareef) clouds driving up from the Indian Ocean are here met by winds from the north and east and buffeted and depressed until they are entrapped by the mountains over the Dhofar plain. Thus, Dhofar is unique on the Southern Arabian coast in that it enjoys monsoon rainfall for some three months of the year.

The Province contains three distinct physical tracts, a cultivated coastal belt, Al Haffah, divided from the mountains by a desert plain some 60 kilometres in length and up to 15 kilometres miles in depth. The mountains enclosing the western end of the plain are precipitous and inaccessible while those to the east rise steeply with many sheer cliffs and deep gorges but are capped by rolling grassy uplands and interspersed with wide park-like valleys well wooded with groves of wild figs, tamarinds, acacias, sycamores. Varieties of evergreens, privets, babuls, wild olives, jasmines, camel thorn, salt cedars and an abundance of wild flowers and grasses provide ample grazing during the summer for herds of dairy cattle, camels and goats numbering many hundreds.

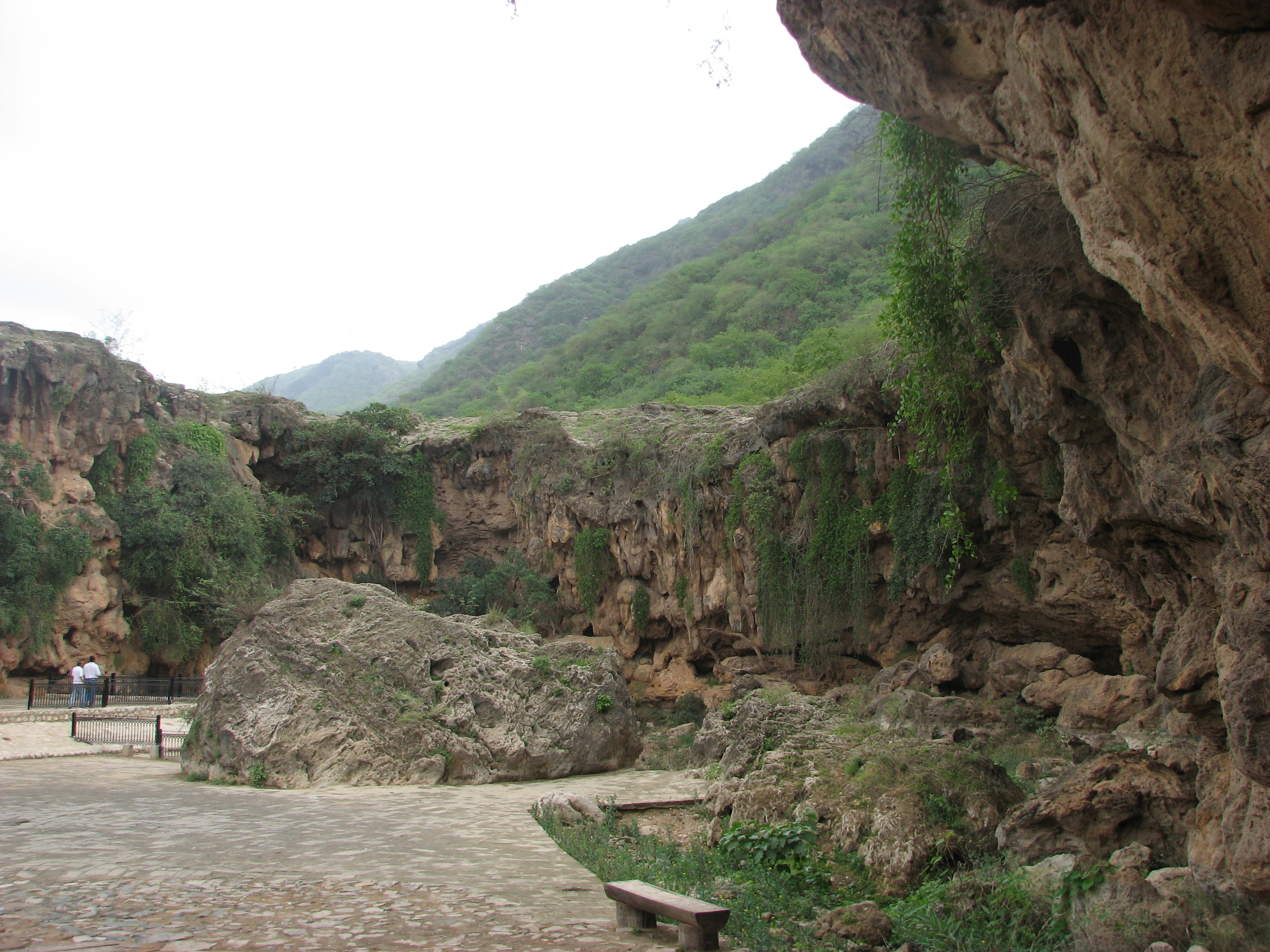
The natural spring of Ayn Jarziz was reported to discharge approximately 40,000 gallons of water per hour in 1943.

The uplands rise gently to a height of between 900 and 1,200 meters at the top of the watershed and thence slope away to the north draining into Wadi Muqshin on the southern edge of the Rub' al Khali (Empty Quarter). Cloud formations are entrapped over the enclosed plain and on southern slopes of the mountains, the reverse slopes draining to the north being practically free of clouds and devoid of moisture. It is in these wadis that the frankincense, for which the mountains have been famous through the ages, grows wild. The dryness of the air determines the quality of the frankincense, the resin of similar trees growing on the southern slopes being spoilt by the rain.

Although the southern slopes enjoy a good rainfall the ground soil does not retain the water. Underground rivers drain the waters of Jabal Aram into Wadi Darbat, the mouth of which is sealed by a sheer limestone cliff 150 meters high. The accumulated waters fill a lake two miles long, situated at a height of 300 meters, and overflow during the rains to form a picturesque waterfall. Other underground rivers feed perennial springs at the foot of the hills. There are six of these springs; Jarziz, the best of them, producing an estimated flow of 150,000 litres of water an hour. These waters, if unharnessed, again disappear underground in the foothills and reappear to feed extensive fresh water creeks in the coastal belt divided from the sea only by narrow sandbars. Fresh water is easily obtainable from shallow wells at a distance of a hundred yards from high water mark and up to a distance of one mile inland, beyond which the increased depth of the water discourages prospective cultivators.

=== Environment ===
Dhofar's forest cover was estimated to be 53,000 hectares in 1989. However, due to human actives and deforestation, it declined to 10,000 hectares in 2020. The forests are home to more than 750 flora species, including 50 endemic species, which counts for more than 75% of Oman's biodiversity.

=== Climate ===
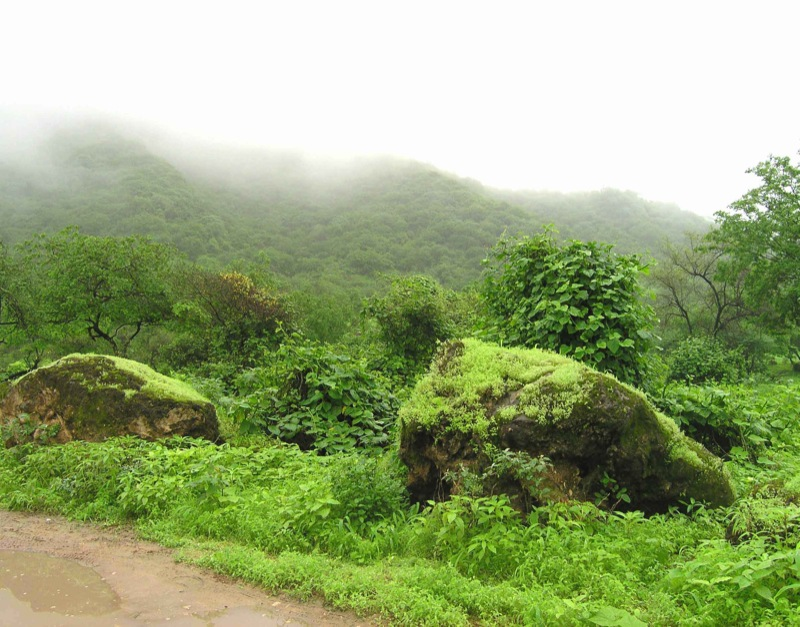
During the Kharīf (Monsoon), the Dhofar Mountains around Salalah are rainsoaked and shrouded in fog

Dhofar has a tropical climate. Dhofar and a small portion of the northern tip of Yemen are directly exposed to the South East monsoon from mid-June to mid-September; this is known as the Khareef. Monsoon clouds keep the summer cool and humid, while the winter months are warm except for periods when cold winds from the northern deserts cause heavy and prolonged dust storms and a sharp fall in temperature. Dhofar's heavy seasonal rainfall contrasts sharply with the neighboring barren Empty Quarter Desert. The Salalah plain was once a well cultivated area with a sophisticated irrigation system.

== Demographics ==
J.G. Lorimer noted in his 1908 publication, the Gazetteer of the Persian Gulf, Oman and Central Arabia, that the two main tribes of Dhofar were the mountain-dwelling Al Qara tribe (for which the Qara Mountain Range was named) and the Al Kathiri tribes (Al-Shanfari, Al-Rawas, Al-Marhoon, Bait Fadhil, Al-Mardoof and Al-Hadhri) who lived in the hills and in villages alike; both were reported to speak dialects of Arabic unknown in other parts of the Arabian Peninsula. Other tribes of importance noted by Lorimer included the Ja'afar tribe, the Bait Al Qalam tribe, the Sayid (or Sadat) tribe, the Hasarit tribe and the Harasis tribe. The inhabitants of Dhofar were described primarily as agriculturalists and were well known for their affinity to 'tobacco', possibly referring to khat which is similar in appearance. At the time of Lorimer's survey, Dhofar had roughly 11,000 inhabitants, the majority of which were Bedouins.

In Gordon Noel Jackson's 1943 treatise on the Dhofar Governorate, he wrote that "the people of the province are as varied as the landscape". He goes on to state that the Arabs of the hills, 'mountain Arabs', were highly nomadic and were not proficient in Standard Arabic. Furthermore, it is asserted that they were not overtly observant of Islamic customs, were highly superstitious, and practiced pre-Islamic rites, much to the indignation of the Sultan of Oman. They engaged in little cultivation due to the arid landscape, instead preferring to trade incense and rear livestock.

In the past, the Hindu festival Diwali was celebrated by practicing Omani Muslims and non-Muslims alike. According to local tradition, the custom was introduced by a Brahmin who was shipwrecked off Dhofar's coast and found a ready acceptance of the festival among the lower classes of Dhofar. Jackson (1943) states that the ruler of Oman prohibited Muslims from participating in these festivities sometime in the early 20th century.

While Arabic speakers from the dominant culture of Oman have come to live in the province, especially the larger cities and towns, Dhofar has been the traditional homeland of many tribespeople speaking Modern South Arabian languages. One of the languages most commonly spoken by Al-Hakli (Qara), Al-Shahri, Al-Barami, Al-Mashaiki and Al-Bathari mountain tribes is the Shehri language (called Jibbali "Mountainous"). The Yemeni language Mehri is somewhat linked to Jeballi. Other indigenous groups speaking smaller languages such as Bat'hari living in the coastal towns of Shuwaymiya and Sharbithat. The Harasis, speaking Harsusi, number 1–2000 and live in Jiddat al-Harasis.

As of April 2024, 54.9% of the population are expatriates and 45.1% are Omanis.

Historical population
Census year	Pop.	±% p.a.
1993	189,094	—
2003	215,960	+1.34%
2010	249,729	+2.10%
2020	416,458	+5.25%
Source: Citypopulation

== Culture and landmarks ==
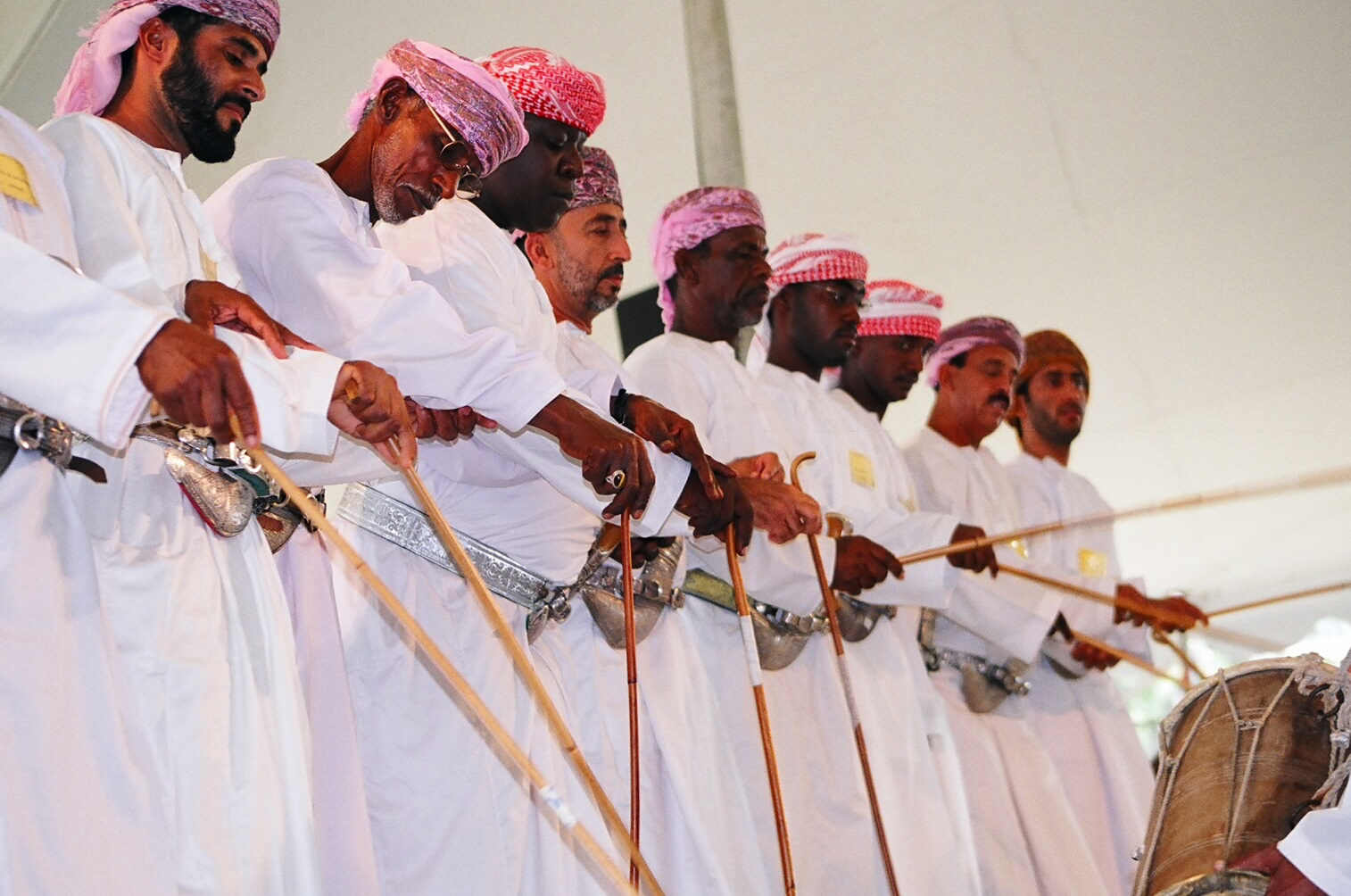
Al-Majd Ensemble at the grand opening of the Smithsonian Folklife Festival in 2005

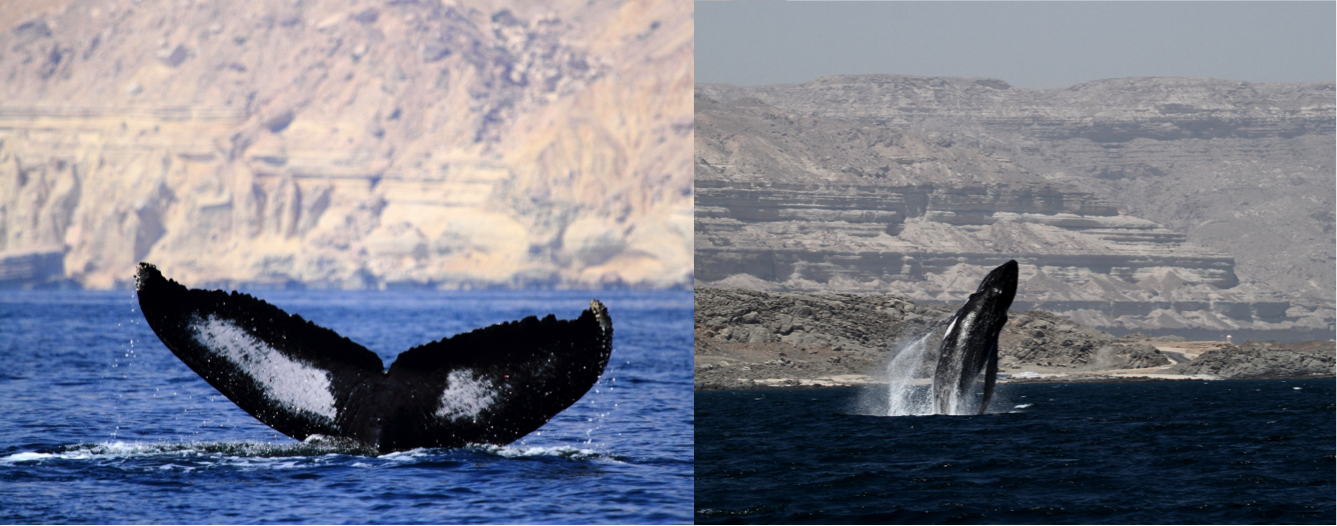
Critically endangered Arabian humpback whales off Dhofar, the most isolated population in the world

Dhofar has a tribal community. The Al Kathiri are the largest tribe in Salalah and Dhofar. Other tribes include the Al-Hakli (Qara), Hashimi, Al-Yafei, Al-Mashaikhi, Al-Shahri, Al-Mahri, Al-Bat'hari, Al-Daroodi (Dhashisha, Siwaqron, Ali Saleban, Warsangeli, Al-bahanta) and Al-Barami. It also is home to many expatriates.

Salalah, the region's capital, has an international airport, one of the largest seaports in the Middle East, several resorts including the Marriott and the Crowne Plaza, and a university. The Burj-al-Nadha clock tower is a local landmark and is featured in the Dhofar Municipality coat of arms.

The Dhofar region is also rich in meteorites.

According to the Church of Jesus Christ of Latter-day Saints, the coasts of Dhofar, perhaps Wadi Sayq, are considered the most likely location of the Book of Mormon land of Bountiful, from which the nomadic family of Lehi sailed, some time after 600 BC, in a ship constructed by his son Nephi, to the New World.

== Administration ==
=== Provinces ===
Dhofar Governorate consists of ten wilayats also called provinces. Al-Mazyunah is the newest after it was declared separate from the Rakhyut wilayat. It was named in honor of Sultan Qaboos bin Said Al Said's mother, Mazoon bint Ahmad Al Mashani. Each wilayat comprises several villages and towns.

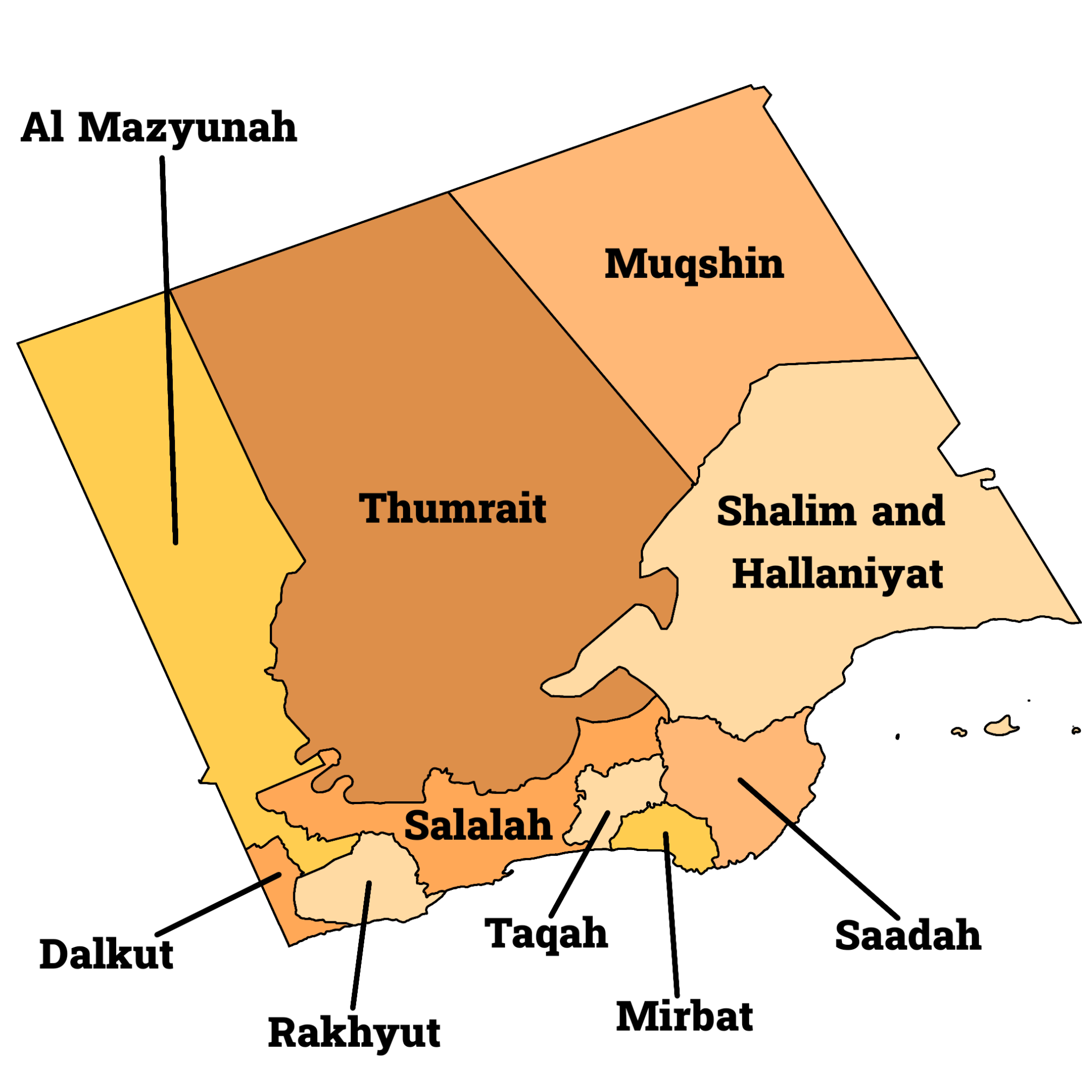
A map of the Dhofar Governorate and its wilayats labeled.

The following are the ten wilayats of Dhofar:

- Al-Mazyūnah (Arabic: ٱلْمَزْيُوْنَة), population (2017): 9,261
- Ḍalkūt (Arabic: ضَلْكُوْت), population (2017): 2,988
- Mirbat (Arabic: مرباط), population (2017): 16,307
- Muqshin (Arabic: مُقْشِن), population (2017): 857
- Rakhyūt (Arabic: رَخْيُوْت), population (2017): 5,049
- Sadah (Arabic: سدح), population (2017): 5,944
- Salalah (capital of the Governorate) (Arabic: صَلَالَة), population (2017): 374,582
- Shalim and the Hallaniyat Islands (Arabic: جزر خوريا موري), population (2017): 4,792
- Taqah (Arabic: طاقة), population (2017): 20,876
- Thumrait (Arabic: ثمريت), population (2017): 16,966

=== Villages ===
Dozens of villages are found in the governorate, particularly around the coast and near major towns. The 1917 Gazetteer of Arabia, produced by the Government in British India and based on J.G. Lorimer's earlier Gazeteer, makes note of the locations, geography and history of several of these villages.

== Economy ==
=== Mining ===
- Shuwaymiya mine (Gypsum)

== See also ==
- Bountiful (Book of Mormon)
- Rism
