= Governorates of Oman =

Governorates of Oman محافظات سلطنة عمان (Arabic)
- Category: Unitary state
- Location: Sultanate of Oman
- Number: 11
- Populations: 49,062 (Musandam) – 1,302,440 (Muscat)
- Areas: 1,800 km^{2} (695 sq mi) (Musandam) – 99,000 km^{2} (38,300 sq mi) (Dhofar)
- Government: Governorance government, National government
- Subdivisions: Provinces

The governorates of Oman (Arabic: محافظات سلطنة عمان), are the 11 first-level administrative divisions of the Sultanate of Oman. These governorates are further divided into 63 wilayats.

== History ==
Before 28 October 2011, Oman was divided into five regions (mintaqah) and four governorates (muhafazah). The governorates were Muscat, Dhofar, Buraimi and Musandam. Buraimi Governorate was created in October 2006 from parts of Ad Dhahirah Region.

Oman is divided into eleven governorates (muhafazah) as of 28 October 2011. Each of the 11 governorates are divided into wilayat (provinces).

== List ==
Governorate	Arabic	Capital (Main Province)	Wilayats	Population (2020 Census)	Area (km²)	Density (per km^{2})	ISO code
Ad Dakhiliyah	محافظة الداخلية	Nizwa	9	478,501	31,900	15	OM-DA
Ad Dhahirah	محافظة الظاهرة	Ibri	3	213,043	37,000	5.75	OM-ZA
Al Batinah North	محافظة شمال الباطنة	Sohar	6	1,250,231	9,000	138.92	OM-BS
Al Batinah South	محافظة جنوب الباطنة	Rustaq	6	465,550	3,500	133.01	OM-BJ
Al Buraimi	محافظة البريمي	Al Buraimi	3	121,802	7,460	16.33	OM-BU
Al Wusta	محافظة الوسطى	Haima	4	52,344	82,471	0.66	OM-WU
Ash Sharqiyah North	محافظة شمال الشرقية	Ibra	7	271,822	36,400	11.16	OM-SS
Ash Sharqiyah South	محافظة جنوب الشرقية	Sur	5	315,445	36,400	26.20	OM-SJ
Dhofar	محافظة ظفار	Salalah	10	416,458	99,300	4.19	OM-ZU
Muscat	محافظة مسقط	Muscat	6	1,302,440	6,500	372.13	OM-MA
Musandam	محافظة مسندم	Khasab	4	49,062	1,800	27.26	OM-MU
Total			63	4,936,698	315,331	15.93	

== See also ==
- ISO 3166-2:OM
