= Lebanese people =

People of Lebanon

Total population
- Lebanon: 4 million (Lebanese diaspora) 4–14 million
- Brazil: 1,000,000 – 7,000,000
- Argentina: 1,200,000 – 1,500,000
- Colombia: 125,000 – 700,000 – 3,200,000
- United States: 440,279
- France: 300,000
- Canada: 250,000
- Australia: 248,434
- Venezuela: 130,000 – 340,000
- Saudi Arabia: 120,000 – 300,000
- Ivory Coast: 100,000 – 300,000
- Ecuador: 98,000 – 170,000
- Mexico: 100,000
- Dominican Republic: 80,000
- United Arab Emirates: 80,000
- Uruguay: 70,000
- Paraguay: 15,500 – 200,000
- Senegal: 50,000
- Sweden: 46,823
- Kuwait: 40,500
- Guinea: 40,000
- Chile: 32,000
- Costa Rica: 30,000
- Greece: 27,420
- El Salvador: 27,400
- Nigeria: 25,000 – 30,000
- Cyprus: 25,700
- Democratic Republic of the Congo: 25,000
- Guatemala: 22,500
- Cuba: 20,000
- Honduras: 20,000
- Bolivia: 12,900
- Haiti: 12,000
- Belgium: 11,000
- South Africa: 5,800 – 20,000
- Switzerland: 10,000
- Guadeloupe (Overseas France): 9,000
- Republic of the Congo: 9,000
- Gabon: 8,000
- Turkey: 7,340
- Cameroon: 6,000
- Israel: 3,500
- Sierra Leone: 3,000
- Benin: 3,000
- Peru: 2,400
- Germany: 2,350
- Togo: 1,600
- French Guiana (Overseas France): 1,500
- Angola: 1,500
- Burkina Faso: 1,300

Languages
- Spoken Vernacular; Lebanese Arabic & Cypriot Maronite Arabic; Diaspora; French, English, Spanish, Portuguese

Religion
- Islam (59.5% in Lebanon):^{2} (Shia,^{3} Sunni,^{3} Alawites, Ismailis and Druze)^{4} Christianity (40.5% in Lebanon; majority of diaspora):^{1} (Maronite, Greek Orthodox, Melkite and Protestant)

Related ethnic groups
- Syrians, Palestinians and Jordanians
- Notes: 1. Lebanese Christians of all denominations constitute the majority of all Lebanese worldwide, but represent only a large minority within Lebanon.; 2. Lebanese Muslims of all denominations represent a majority within Lebanon, but add up to only a large minority of all Lebanese worldwide.; 3. Shias and Sunnis account for 54% of Lebanon's population together, even split in half (27%).; 4. In Lebanon, the Druze quasi-Muslim sect is officially categorized as a Muslim denomination by the Lebanese government.

Lebanese people (Note: Arabic: الشعب اللبناني, romanized: aš-šaʿb al-lubnānī, Lebanese Arabic pronunciation: [eʃˈʃæʕeb el.lɪbˈneːni, -ne].) are the people native to or originating from Lebanon. The term may also include those who had inhabited Mount Lebanon and the Anti-Lebanon Mountains prior to the creation of the modern Lebanese state. The major religious groups among the Lebanese people within Lebanon are Sunni Muslims (27%), Shia Muslims (27%), Maronite Christians (21%), Greek Orthodox Christians (8%), Melkite Christians (5%), Druze (5%), Protestant Christians (1%). The largest contingent of Lebanese, however, comprise a diaspora in North America, South America, Europe, Australia and Africa, which is predominantly Maronite Christian.

As the relative proportion of the various sects is politically sensitive, Lebanon has not collected official census data on ethnic background since 1932 under the French Mandate. It is therefore difficult to have an exact demographic analysis of Lebanese society. The largest concentration of people with Lebanese ancestry may be in Brazil, having an estimated population of 5.8 to 7 million. However, it may be an exaggeration given that an official survey conducted by the Brazilian Institute of Geography and Statistics (IBGE) showed that less than 1 million Brazilians claimed any Middle-Eastern origin. The Lebanese have always traveled the world, many of them settling permanently within the last two centuries.

Estimated to have lost their status as the majority in Lebanon itself, with their reduction in numbers largely as a result of their emigration, Christians still remain one of the principal religious groups in the country. Descendants of Lebanese Christians make up the majority of Lebanese people worldwide, appearing principally in the diaspora.

== Identity ==
The Lebanese identity is rooted in a shared history and culture. Their rich cultural heritage includes food, music, literature, and art, which is also shaped by the country's location at the crossroads of the Eastern Mediterranean. This has allowed it to be a meeting point for different cultures and traditions.

Lebanon's religious diversity is also a significant component of the national identity. The country is home to a plurality of religious communities, including Muslims, Christians, Druze, and Jews. Each community has its own distinct religious practices, traditions, and customs, which have been passed down through generations.

However, the identity has also been shaped by a long history of political and social conflict. The country has experienced a series of civil wars, foreign invasions, political crises, and economic problems, which has deepened divisions between different communities and eroded trust in the government and institutions.

Lebanon has managed to maintain a sense of national unity and identity. In the face of political and social challenges, the Lebanese people are known for their resilience and their ability to come together in times of crisis which has helped to strengthen their sense of national identity.

Among Lebanese Maronites, Aramaic still remains the liturgical language of the Maronite Church, although in an Eastern Aramaic form (the Syriac language, in which early Christianity was disseminated throughout the Middle East), is distinct from the spoken Aramaic of Lebanon, which was a Western Aramaic language. Some Lebanese Christians identify themselves as Lebanese rather than Arab, seeking to draw on "the Phoenician past to try to forge an identity separate from the prevailing Arab culture".

The conquest of Lebanon during the Arab and Islamic conquests was linked to the conquest of Bilād Al-Shām as a whole, or what is known as the Levant, being an integral part of it, the Arab Muslims swiftly took it from the Byzantine Empire during the era of Caliph Umar Ibn Al-Khattab, who ordered the division of the Levant when he conquered it, into four Ajnad, including the Jund Dimashq which includes Mount Lebanon with its corresponding western coastal plains and the eastern interior plains. Arabization and Islamization of the Levant began in the 7th century, and it took several centuries for Islam, the Arab identity, and language to spread; the Arabs of the caliphate did not attempt to spread their language or religion in the early periods of the conquest, and formed an isolated aristocracy. The Arabs of the caliphate accommodated many new tribes in isolated areas to avoid conflict with the locals; caliph Uthman ordered his governor, Muawiyah I, to settle the new tribes away from the original population. Syrians who belonged to Monophysitic denominations welcomed the peninsular Arabs as liberators.

The Abbasids in the eighth and ninth century sought to integrate the peoples under their authority, and the Arabization of the administration was one of the tools. Arabization gained momentum with the increasing numbers of Muslim converts; the ascendancy of Arabic as the formal language of the state prompted the cultural and linguistic assimilation of Syrian converts. Those who remained Christian also became Arabized; it was probably during the Abbasid period in the ninth century that Christians adopted Arabic as their first language; the first translation of the gospels into Arabic took place in this century. Many historians, such as Claude Cahen and Bernard Hamilton, proposed that the Arabization of Christians was completed before the First Crusade. By the thirteenth century, Arabic language achieved dominance in the region and its speakers became Arabs thereof.

== Demographics ==
The total Lebanese population is estimated at 8 to 18 million. Of these, the vast majority, or 4- 14 million, constitute part of the Lebanese diaspora (residing outside of Lebanon), with approximately 4.7 million citizens residing in Lebanon itself.

=== Lebanon ===
There are approximately 4.7 million Lebanese citizens in Lebanon.

In addition to this figure, there are an additional 1 million foreign workers (mainly Syrians), and about 470,000 Palestinian refugees in the nation.

Lebanon is also a home to various ethnic minorities found refuge in the country over the centuries. Prominent ethnic minorities in the country include the Armenians, the Kurds, the Turks, the Assyrians, the Iranians and some European ethnicities (Greeks, Italians, French).

There are also a small number of nomadic Dom people, an ethnic group with origins in the Indian subcontinent.

=== Diaspora ===
The Lebanese diaspora consists of approximately 4- 14 million, both Lebanese-born living abroad and those born-abroad of Lebanese descent. The majority of the Lebanese in the diaspora are Christians, disproportionately so in the Americas where the vast majority reside. An estimate figure show that they represent about 75% of the Lebanese in total. Lebanese abroad are considered "rich, educated and influential" and over the course of time immigration has yielded Lebanese "commercial networks" throughout the world.

The largest number of Lebanese is to be found in Brazil, where according to the Brazilian and Lebanese governments claim, there are 7 million Brazilians of Lebanese descent. These figures, however, may be an exaggeration given that, according to a 2008 survey conducted by IBGE, in 2008, covering only the states of Amazonas, Paraíba, São Paulo, Rio Grande do Sul, Mato Grosso and Distrito Federal, 0.9% of white Brazilian respondents said they had family origins in the Middle East

Large numbers also reside elsewhere in North America, most notably in the United States (489,702) and in Canada, the people of full or partial Lebanese descent are between 190,275 (by ancestry, 2011 Census) to 250,000 based on estimates. In the rest of the Americas, significant communities are found in Argentina, Mexico (400,000); Chile, Colombia and Venezuela, with almost every other Latin American country having at least a small presence.

In Africa, Senegal and the Ivory Coast are home to over 100,000 Lebanese. There are significant Lebanese populations in other countries throughout Western and Central Africa. Australia hosts over 180,000 and Canada 250,000. In the Arab world, around 400,000 Lebanese live in the Arab states of the Persian Gulf. More than 2,500 ex-SLA members remain in Israel.

Until recently, Lebanon provided no automatic right to Lebanese citizenship for emigrants who lost their citizenship upon acquiring the citizenship of their host country, nor for the descendants of emigrants born abroad. This situation disproportionately affected Christians. In 2008, the Maronite Institution of Emigrants called for the establishment of an avenue by which emigrants who lost their citizenship may regain it, or their overseas-born descendants (if they so wish) may acquire it.

On November 24, 2015, the Lebanese authorities enacted Law #41, "Reacquiring the Lebanese Citizenship". Under this law, members of the Lebanese diaspora can apply to reacquire the Lebanese citizenship, it specifies that applications must be submitted before November 25, 2025.

In 2017, the Ministry of Foreign Affairs & Emigrants launched an initiative called "The Lebanese Nationality Program" or "Lebanity", for people of Lebanese heritage around the world to apply for Lebanese Nationality, allowing them to benefit from their business, financial, consular, personal, social and political rights as Lebanese, wherever they are. In particular, this initiative is relevant for the large Lebanese communities in different countries all over the world.

Applications are reviewed by a committee within the Ministry of Interior and Municipalities of Lebanon. If an application is denied, the applicant can appeal the decision within one month from the date they are officially notified, using the address specified in their application.

To be eligible, applicants must have their names, or the names of their paternal ancestors or male relatives on their father's side, listed in the 1921–1924 census records (either residents or immigrants registers) and/or the 1932 immigrants registers, which are maintained by the Ministry of Interior and Municipalities.

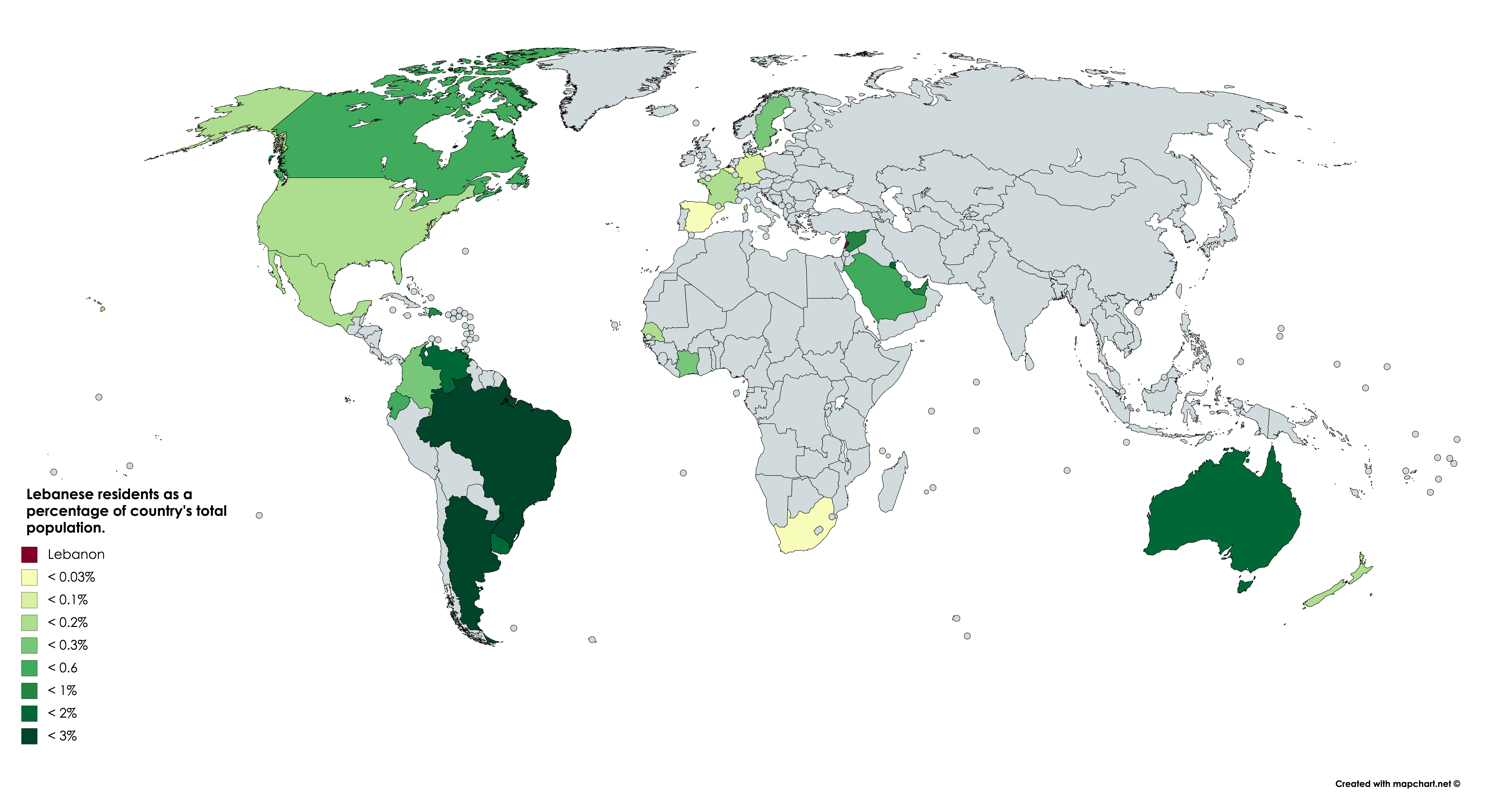
Lebanese residents as a percentage of country's total population

=== Religion ===
Lebanese Muslims
Year	Percent
1932	49%
1985	56%
2010	61%
2014	65%

Lebanese Christians
Year	Percent
1932	51%
1985	44%
2010	39%
2014	35%

Lebanese people are very diverse in faith. The country has the most religiously diverse society in the Middle East, encompassing 17 recognized religious sects. The main two religions among the Lebanese people are Christianity (the Maronite Church, the Greek Orthodox Church, the Melkite, the Protestant Church) and Islam (Shia and Sunni). The third-largest religion is Druze. There are other non-Lebanese Christian minorities such as Armenians (Armenian Apostolic Church and Armenian Catholic Church), French-Italians (Latin Catholic Lebanese), Assyrians (Assyrian Church of the East, Syriac Catholic Church, Syriac Orthodox Church, Chaldean Catholic Church) and Copts (Coptic Orthodox Church of Alexandria), who immigrated to Lebanon over the years. No official census has been taken since 1932, reflecting the political sensitivity in Lebanon over confessional (i.e. religious) balance.

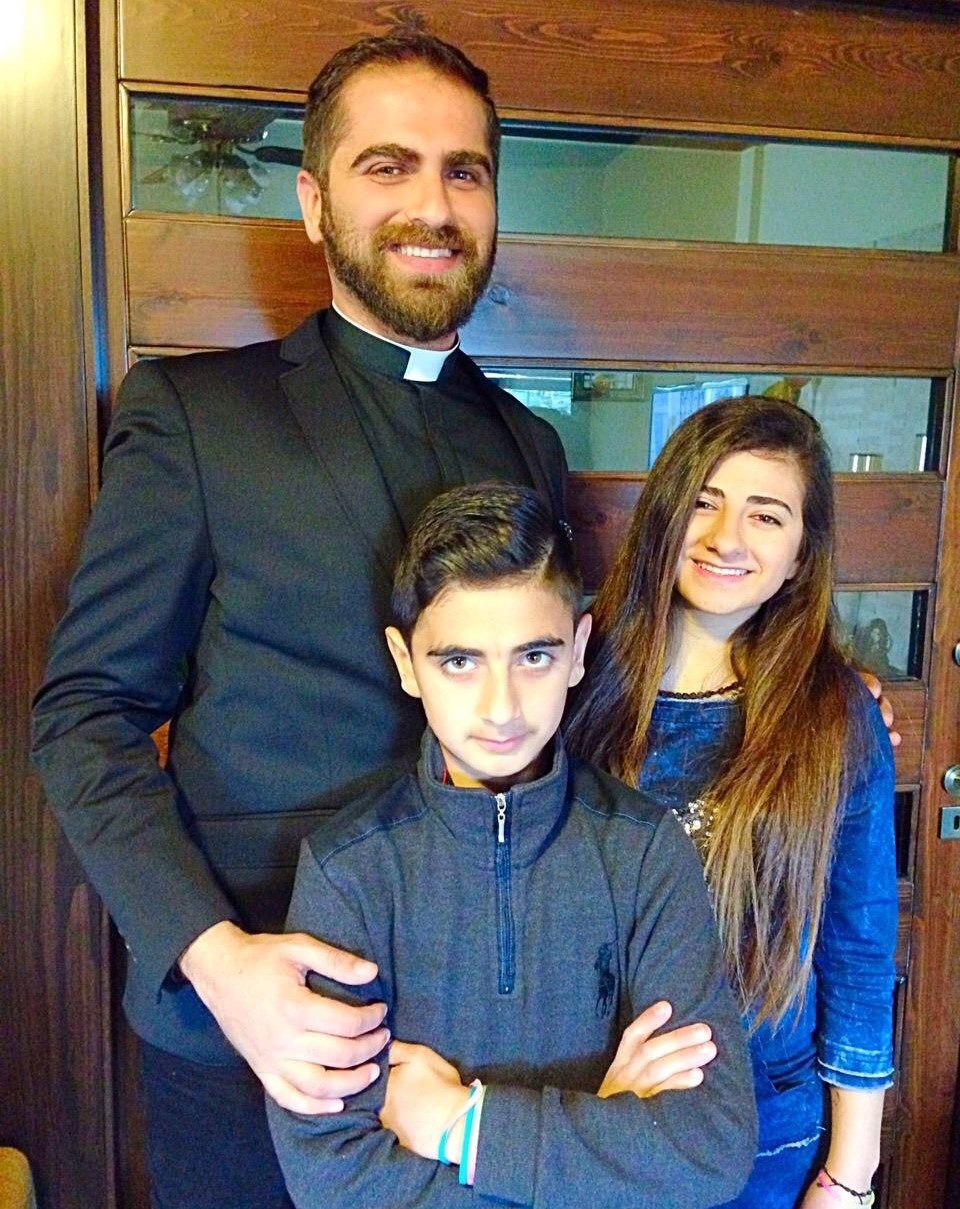
Lebanese Christian priest and his children in 2023.

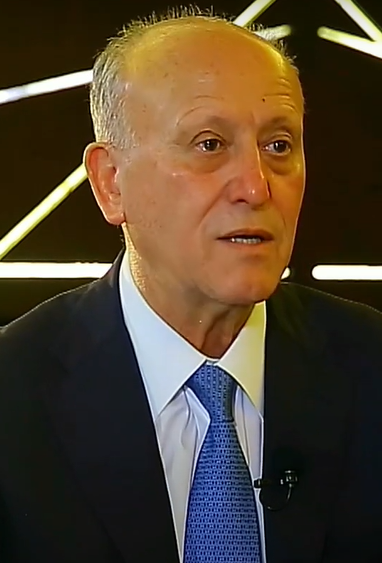
Lebanese Sunni politician, Ashraf Rifi

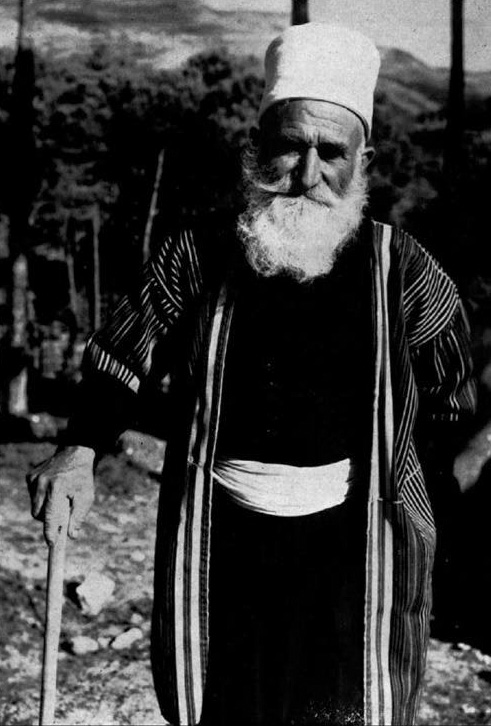
Druze sheikh from a village in the mountains near Beit ed-Dine

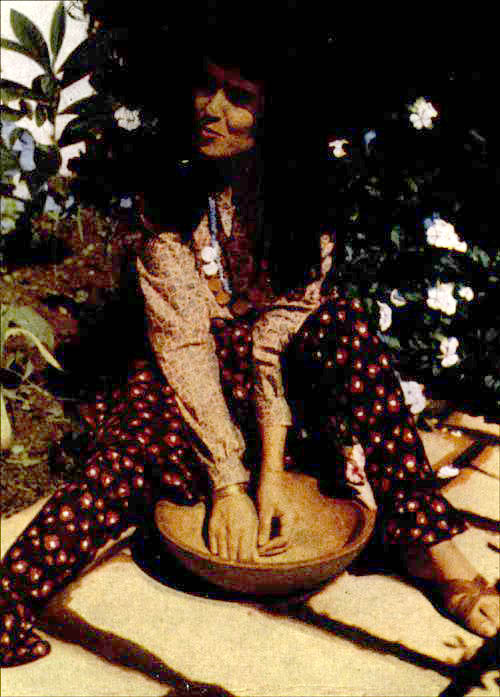
Metouali (Shia) Woman of the Beqaa Valley, 1970's

A study conducted by Statistics Lebanon, a Beirut-based research firm, cited by the United States Department of State found that of Lebanon's population of approximately 4.3 million is estimated to be: 54% Islam (Shia and Sunni, 27% each), 40.5% Christian (21% Maronite, 8% Greek Orthodox, 5% Melkite Catholics, 1% Protestant, 5.5% other minority Christian denominations like Latin Catholics, Armenian Orthodox, Armenian Catholic, Syriac Catholic, Syriac Orthodox, Chaldean Catholic, Assyrian Catholic and Coptic Orthodox) and 5.5% Druze (a minority religion, descended from Shia Islam, who do not consider themselves to be Muslim, even though under the terms of the Lebanese Constitution the Druze community is designated as a part of the Lebanese Muslim community.)

There are also very small numbers of other religions such as Judaism, Mormons, Baháʼí Faith. While Jews have been present in Lebanon since ancient times, their numbers had dwindled during the Muslim era. By the 2000s the Jewish quarter of Beirut, Wadi Abu Jamil, was virtually abandoned, and there were only around 40 Jews left in Beirut. Many well-established Lebanese Jewish diaspora communities exists, such as in Brazil, France, Switzerland, Canada and the United States.

With the diaspora included, the Christians are an absolute majority. Lebanon has a population of Mhallamis also known as Mardinli), most of whom migrated from northeast Syria and southeast Turkey are estimated to be between 75,000 and 100,000 and considered to be part of the Sunni population. These have in recent years been granted Lebanese citizenship and, coupled with several civil wars between Islamic extremists and the Lebanese military that have caused many Christians to flee the country, have re-tipped the demographic balance in favour of the Muslims and the Sunnis in particular. In addition, many thousands of Arab Bedouins in the Bekaa and in the Wadi Khaled region, who are entirely Sunnis, were granted Lebanese citizenship. Lebanon also has a Jewish population, estimated at less than 100.

== Society and culture ==
=== Language ===
Most Lebanese people communicate in the Lebanese variety of Levantine Arabic, but Lebanon's official language is Modern Standard Arabic (MSA). French is recognized and used next to MSA on road signs and Lebanese banknotes. Lebanon's native sign language is the Lebanese dialect of Levantine Arabic Sign Language. English is the fourth language by number of users, after Levantine, MSA, and French. Lebanon's official language, Modern Standard Arabic (MSA), has no native speakers in or outside Lebanon. It is almost never used in conversations and is learned through formal instruction rather than transmission from parent to child.

The majority of Lebanese people speak Lebanese Arabic, which is grouped in a larger category called Levantine Arabic, while Modern Standard Arabic is mostly used in magazines, newspapers, and formal broadcast media. Code-switching between Arabic and French is very common.

French is a common non-native language in Lebanon, with about 50% of the population being Francophone. A law determines the cases in which the French language is to be used within government, and is often used as a prestige language for business, diplomacy and education. Almost 40% of Lebanese are considered francophone, and another 15% "partial francophone," and 70% of Lebanon's secondary schools use French as a second language of instruction. The use of Arabic by Lebanon's educated youth is declining, as they usually prefer to speak in French and, to a lesser extent, English. It is also a reaction to the negativity associated with Arabic since the September 11 attacks. In 1997, the Lebanese government committed to a policy of trilingualism in education, including French and English alongside the official Arabic language in the curriculum. L'Orient-Le Jour is a Lebanese French-language newspaper.

Syriac Aramaic is also spoken as a first language in some Lebanese communities such as Syriac Catholics, Syriac Orthodox and Assyrian Lebanese. Syriac remained both the sole vernacular language of the Maronites until the 14th century when the Mamluks conquered North Lebanon. It is It still used in liturgies by the Maronite church.

=== Cuisine ===
Lebanese cuisine has ancient roots and is part of the culinary tradition of the Eastern Mediterranean. Many dishes in Lebanese cuisine can be traced back thousands of years to eras of Phoenician, Persian, Egyptian, Neo-Babylonian, Roman, Greek, Byzantine, Arab and Ottoman rule. In the last 500 years, Lebanese cuisine has been influenced by the different foreign civilizations that held power. From 1516 to 1918, the Ottoman Turks controlled Lebanon and introduced a variety of foods that have become staples in the Lebanese diet, such as cooking with lamb. After the Ottomans were defeated in World War I (1914–1918), France took control of Lebanon until 1943, when the country achieved its independence. The French introduced foods such as flan, caramel custard, eclairs, french fries and croissants.

The Lebanese diaspora who live worldwide has introduced new ingredients, spices and culinary practices into Lebanese cuisine, keeping the cuisine innovative and renowned both beyond and within its borders. Chef and writer Tara Khattar describes her style of cookery as 'progressive Lebanese cuisine'.

=== Literature ===
In literature, Kahlil Gibran is the third best-selling poet of all time, behind Shakespeare and Laozi. He is particularly known for his book The Prophet (1923), which has been translated into over twenty different languages. Ameen Rihani was a major figure in the mahjar literary movement developed by Arab emigrants in North America, and an early theorist of Arab nationalism. Mikhail Naimy is widely recognized as among the most important figures in modern Arabic letters and among the most important spiritual writers of the 20th century. Several contemporary Lebanese writers have also achieved international success; including Elias Khoury, Amin Maalouf, Hanan al-Shaykh, and Georges Schéhadé.

=== Family ===
Family life is very important in the Lebanese culture. Family functioning is associated with the values of collectivism in the Lebanese society. One person's family functioning is indicative of their individual status and identity. The average household size in Lebanon ranges between 3.9 and 4.9. Child-rearing practices are characterized by abundant protection imposed on children by parents. Unlike Western societies, parental control does not stop at the age of 18; instead, it continues for as long as the child lives in the parents' residence or until the child marries.

Though Lebanon is a secular country, family matters such as marriage, divorce and inheritance are still handled by the religious authorities representing a person's faith. Calls for civil marriage are unanimously rejected by the religious authorities but civil marriages held in another country are recognized by Lebanese civil authorities.

=== Music ===
Music is famous in Lebanese society. While traditional folk music remains popular in Lebanon, modern music reconciling traditional styles, pop, and fusion are rapidly advancing in popularity. Radio stations feature a variety of genres and languages, including traditional, classical Arabic and Armenian Prominent traditional musicians include Fairuz, an icon during the Lebanese civil war, Sabah, Melhem Barakat, Wadih El Safi, Majida El Roumi, and Najwa Karam who built an international audience for the genre. Marcel Khalife, a musician who blends classical Arab music with modern sounds, boasts immense popularity for his politically charged lyrics. Distinguished pop artists include Nancy Ajram, Haifa Wehbe, Fadl Shaker, Elissa, and Mika.

According to the World Intellectual Property Organization, Lebanon's music industry is growing and could attain leading status in the region. Lebanese performers are celebrated throughout the Arab World, and with the notable exception of Egypt enjoy increasing regional popularity. Rising demand for Arabic music outside Western Asia has provided Lebanese artists with a small but significant global audience. However, widespread piracy continues to inhibit the music industry's growth.

== Genetics ==
=== Y-DNA haplogroups ===
In a 2011 genetic study by Haber et al. which analyzed the male-line Y-chromosome genetics of the different religious groups of Lebanon, revealed no large genetic differentiation between the Maronites, Greek Orthodox Christians, Greek Catholic Christians, Sunni Muslims, Shia Muslims, and Druze of the country in regards to the more frequent haplogroups. Major differences between Lebanese groups were found among the less frequent haplogroups.

=== Canaanite origins ===
In a 2017 study by Haber et al., the authors concluded that modern-day Lebanese individuals "derive most of their ancestry from a Canaanite-related population". This finding "implies substantial genetic continuity in the Levant since at least the Bronze Age." Additionally, the researchers identified Eurasian ancestry in modern Lebanese genomes that was absent in Bronze Age populations. They estimated Eurasian ancestry appeared in the Levant approximately 3,750–2,170 years ago.

=== Autosomal DNA ===
In a 2020 study published in the American Journal of Human Genetics, authors showed that there is substantial genetic continuity in Lebanon and the Levant since the Bronze Age (3300–1200 BC) interrupted by three significant admixture events during the Iron Age, Hellenistic, and Ottoman period, each contributing 3%–11% of non-local ancestry to the admixed population. The admixtures were tied to the Sea Peoples of the Late Bronze Age collapse, South or Central Asians, and Ottoman Turks, respectively.

=== Relationship with other populations ===
One study by the International Institute of Anthropology in Paris, France, confirmed similarities in the Y-haplotype frequencies in Lebanese, Palestinian, and Sephardic Jewish men, identifying them as "three Near-Eastern populations sharing a common geographic origin." The study surveyed one Y-specific DNA polymorphism (p49/Taq I) in 54 Lebanese and 69 Palestinian males, and compared with the results found in 693 Jews from three distinct Jewish ethnic groups; Mizrahim, Sephardim, and Ashkenazim.

== See also ==
- Culture of Lebanon
- History of Lebanon
- List of Lebanese people
