= French in Lebanon =

French in Lebanon may refer to:

- French language in Lebanon
- French people in Lebanon
- Greater Lebanon
  - Lebanese Independence Day
- Embassy of France, Beirut
