= French language in Lebanon =

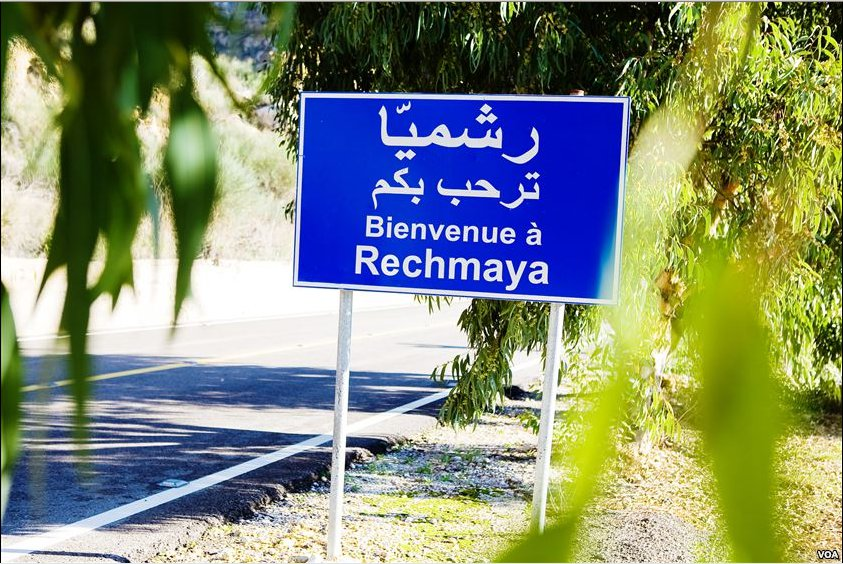
Town sign in Standard Arabic and French at the entrance of Rechmaya, Lebanon

French is a common language in Lebanon, with about 40% of the population being Francophone. A law determines the cases in which the French language is to be used within government, and is often used as a prestige language for business, diplomacy and education.

== History ==
The use of the French language is a legacy of the time of the French Crusades and France's mandate in the region, including its League of Nations mandate over Lebanon following World War I; as of 2004, some 20% of the population used French on a daily basis.

French stopped being an official language in 1943. After independence, American oil companies based themselves in Lebanon, leading to the rise of English as an influential language in international commerce in Lebanon. According to the New York Times, this led to the overtaking of French by English in the commercial realm.

== Role and purpose ==
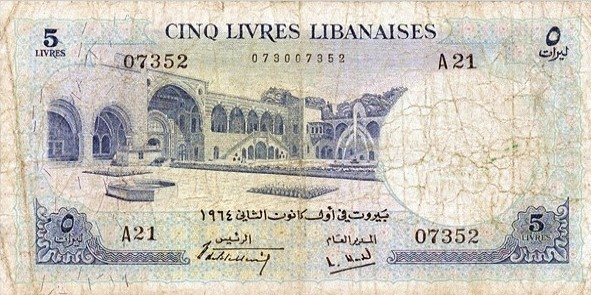
Lebanese bank note

Formerly under French mandate, independent Republic of Lebanon designates Arabic as the sole official language, while a special law regulates cases when French can be publicly used.

Article 11 of Lebanon's Constitution states that

"Arabic is the official national language. A law determines the cases in which the French language is to be used".

The French language is used on Lebanese pound bank notes, road signs, vehicle registration plates, and on public buildings, alongside Arabic.

The majority of Lebanese people speak Lebanese Arabic, which is grouped in a larger category called Levantine Arabic, while Modern Standard Arabic is mostly used in magazines, newspapers, and formal broadcast media. Code-switching between Arabic and French is very common.

Almost 40% of Lebanese are considered francophone, and another 15% "partial francophone," and 70% of Lebanon's secondary schools use French as a second language of instruction. By comparison, English is used as a secondary language in 30% of Lebanon's secondary schools. The use of Arabic by Lebanon's educated youth is declining, as they usually prefer to speak in French and, to a lesser extent, English. It is also a reaction to the negativity associated with Arabic since the September 11 attacks.

== Attitudes toward French ==
Lebanese licence plate with the French language inscription Liban

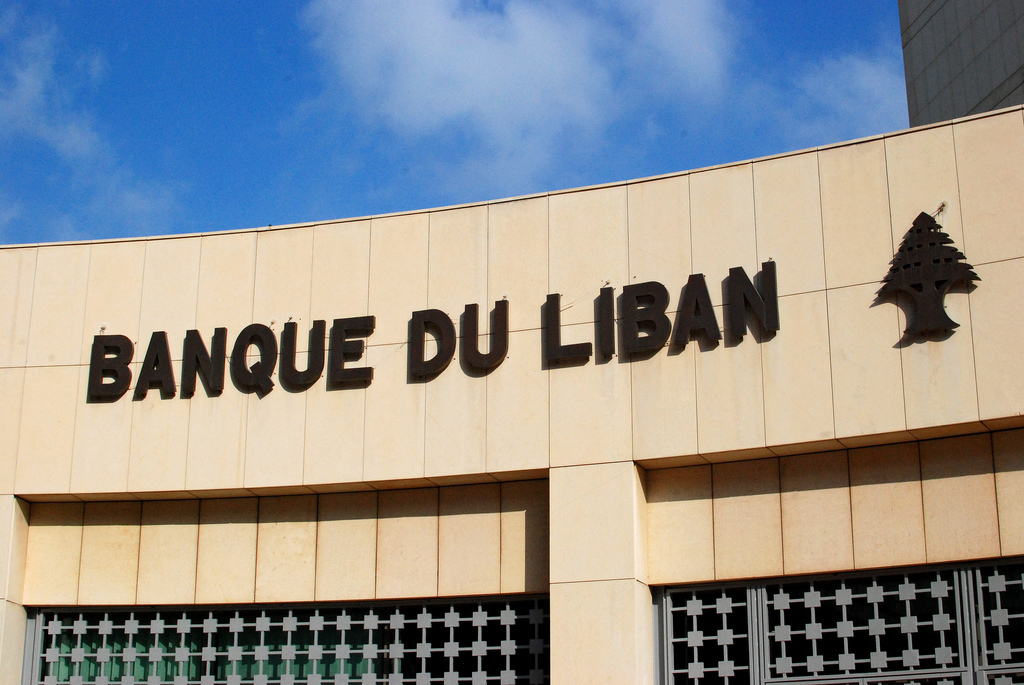
French-language inscription Banque du Liban on the headquarters of the Bank of Lebanon

French and English are secondary languages of Lebanon, with about 40% of the population being Francophone as a second language and 40% Anglophone. In addition to the 40–45% of Lebanese being considered francophone, there are another 15% who are considered "partial francophone", and 70% of Lebanon's secondary schools use French as a second language of instruction. The use of English is growing in the business and media environment. Out of about 900,000 students, about 500,000 are enrolled in Francophone schools, public or private, in which the teaching of mathematics and scientific subjects is provided in French. Actual usage of French varies depending on the region and social status. One third of high school students educated in French go on to pursue higher education in English-speaking institutions. English is the language of business and communication, with French being an element of social distinction and chosen for its historical emotional value to many Christians. However, the economic opportunities and size of the French-speaking world makes French a must-have in business, sciences and international relations.

In 1997, the Lebanese government committed to a policy of trilingualism in education, including French and English alongside the official Arabic language in the curriculum.

== See also ==
- English language in Lebanon
- France–Lebanon relations
- Geographical distribution of French speakers
- French people in Lebanon
- Lebanese people in France

== Works cited ==
- Aithnard, Aminata (2014). La langue française dans le monde 2014 (PDF) (in French). Nathan. ISBN 978-2-09-882654-0. Archived from the original (PDF) on 12 April 2015.
