= French people in Lebanon =

Demographic

French Lebanese Français du Liban, Franco-Libanais
Total population
- 18,751 (2024)

Regions with significant populations
- Beirut (Greater Beirut), Tripoli

Languages
- French, Lebanese Arabic

Religion
- Predominantly Roman Catholic

Related ethnic groups
- Lebanese

French people in Lebanon (or French Lebanese) are French citizens resident in Lebanon, including many binationals and persons of mixed ancestry. French statistics estimated that there were around 23,000 French citizens living in Lebanon in 2020. There are neither official Lebanese statistics nor any scientific information regarding their spoken languages and supposed religious affiliations.

== History ==
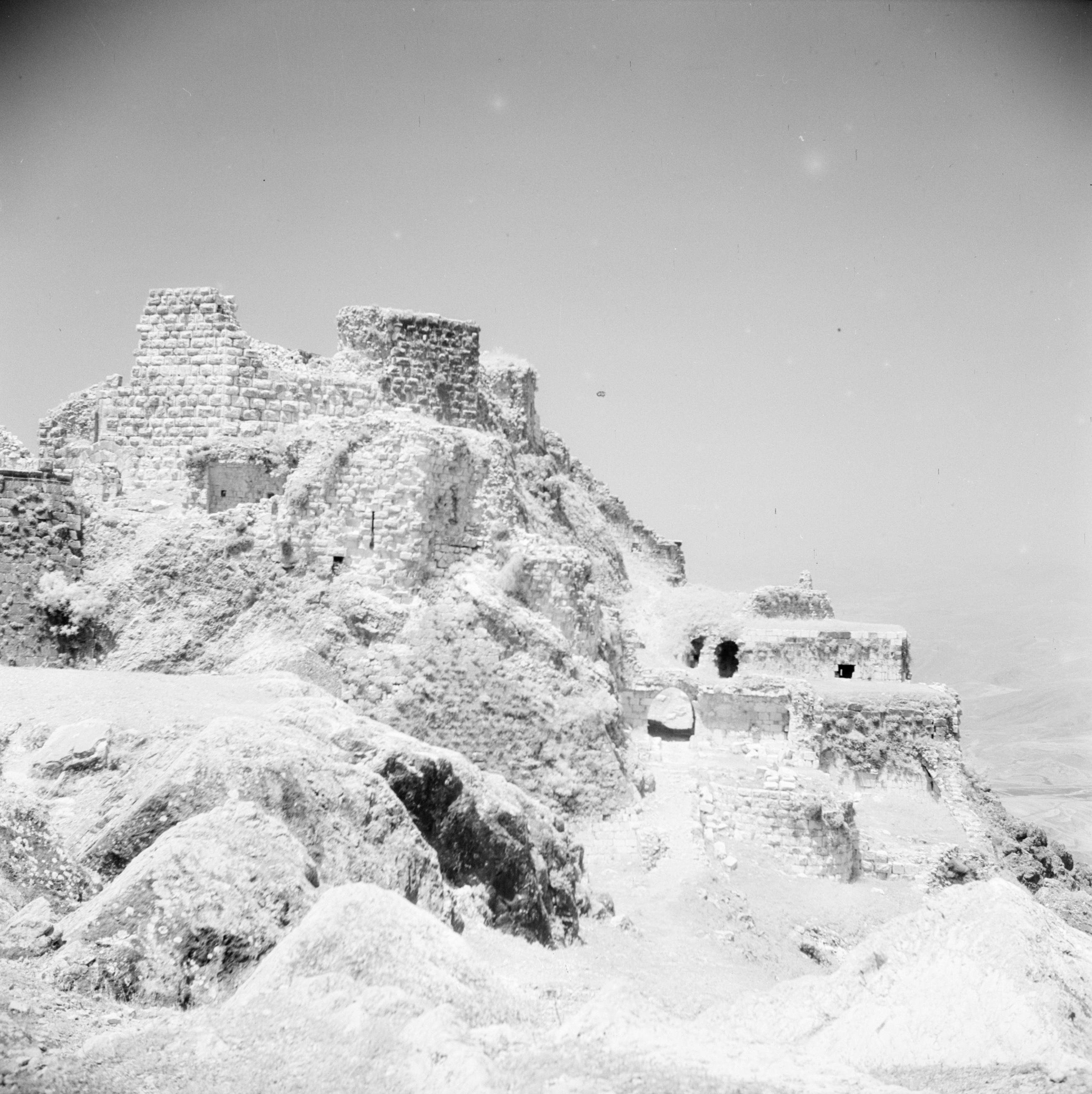
Beaufort, a French crusader castle, Lebanon

In the 13th century, the king of France, Louis IX pledged to protect the Maronites. In the 16th century, Francis I of France forged an alliance with the sultan of the Ottoman Empire, Suleiman the Magnificent; the Ottomans controlled the region and granted the French monarch the role of "protector of eastern Christians". In the 19th century, French Jesuits established schools in Lebanon as well as Saint Joseph University, established in 1875. According to Alex Issa, the French played a major role in the education of the Christian elite of Lebanon, amongst other things, teaching the elites French history and the French language. After the defeat of the Ottoman empire in the First World War, a French mandate was established over Lebanon in the Treaty of Sèvres of 1920. In 1943, Lebanon became independent from France. In 1989 following Syrian attacks on Lebanon, France sent an armada to protect 6000 French citizens according to the French government and according to the New York Times, unofficially to protect the Christian population of Lebanon.

== Political representation ==
For the elections at the Assembly of French Citizens Abroad, Lebanon is part of the Beirut electoral district, including also Syria, Iraq and Jordan, where there are small French communities. The three representatives elected on 18 June 2006 (4,156 votes in total, 3,787 in Lebanon) are all members of right-wing groups in the Assembly: Jean-Louis Mainguy (born in 1953 in Beirut, Union of Democrats, Independents and Liberals), Denise Revers-Haddad (born in 1940 in Varennes-Jarcy, Rally of French Citizens Abroad) and Marcel Laugel (born in 1931 in Algiers, then French Algeria, Union of Democrats, Independents and Liberals).

For the June 2012 French legislative election, Lebanon is part of a large constituency for French residents overseas, the tenth, including Central, Eastern and Southern Africa and much of the Middle East. On 31 December 2011, there were 21,428 registered French electors in Lebanon out of 147,997 for the whole constituency. Out of 11 candidates presently known, only two are – at least partially – living in Lebanon, none from the two main parties.

== French Lebanese in France ==
At the French National Assembly, there were two French Lebanese deputies for the 2007–2012 mandate, Henri Jibrayel (member of the Socialist Party) and Élie Aboud (born in Beirut in 1959, member of the Union for a Popular Movement). In the 2007–2012 Union for a Popular Movement governments, there was a French Lebanese member, Éric Besson, whose mother is Lebanese.

== See also ==
- Count of Tripoli
- French Mandate of Syria and the Lebanon
- Lebanon
- France
- French Empire
- France–Lebanon relations
- French diaspora
- Lebanese people in France
- Latin Church in Lebanon
- French language in Lebanon
- Latin Church in the Middle East
