= Languages of Lebanon =

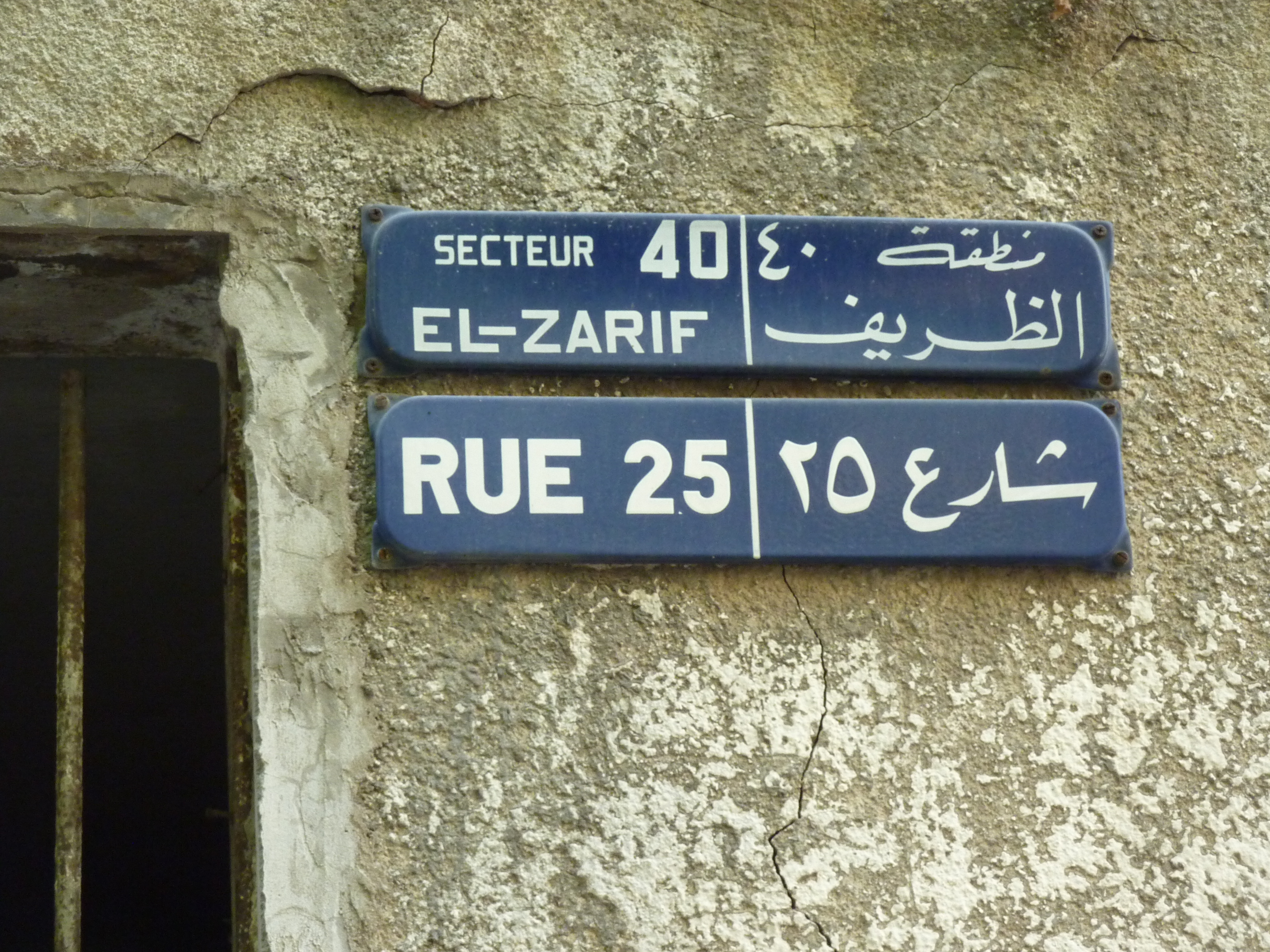
- Official: Modern Standard Arabic (MSA)
- Semi-official: French
- Main: Lebanese dialect of Levantine Arabic
- Minority: Armenian, Kurdish, Aramaic (Syriac), Domari
- Foreign: English
- Signed: Lebanese Sign Language
- Keyboard layout: Arabic keyboard or QWERTY

In Lebanon, the official language is Modern Standard Arabic (MSA), but most people communicate in the Lebanese dialect of Levantine Arabic. Fluency in both English and French is widespread, with around two million speakers of each language. Furthermore, French is recognized and used next to MSA on road signs and Lebanese banknotes. Most Armenians in Lebanon can speak Western Armenian, and some can speak Turkish. Additionally, different sign languages are used by different people and educational establishments.

Lebanon exists in a state of diglossia: MSA is used in formal writing and the news, while Lebanese Arabic—the variety of Levantine Arabic—is used as the native language in conversations and for informal written communication. When writing Levantine, Lebanese people use the Arabic script (more formal) or Arabizi (less formal). Arabizi can be written on a QWERTY keyboard and is used out of convenience.

Mutual intelligibility between Lebanese and other Levantine varieties is high. Arabs consider both MSA and Lebanese Arabic to be part of a single Arabic language, but some sources count Levantine and MSA as two languages of the same language family.

== Statistics ==
According to Ethnologue (28th ed., 2025), these languages have the most users in Lebanon:

1. Levantine Arabic – 5,420,000
2. Modern Standard Arabic – 4,780,000
3. English – 2,110,000
4. French – 1,990,000
5. Western Armenian – 259,000
6. Turkish – 189,000

== Diglossia and local varieties' classification ==
Lebanon—and the Arab world in general—exists in a state of diglossia: the language used in literature, formal writing, or other specific settings is very divergent from that used in conversations. Lebanon's official language, Modern Standard Arabic (MSA), has no native speakers in or outside Lebanon. It is almost never used in conversations and is learned through formal instruction rather than transmission from parent to child. MSA is the language of literature, official documents, and formal written media (newspapers, instruction leaflets, school books), and in spoken form, it is mostly used when reading from a scripted text (e.g., news bulletins) and for prayer and sermons in the mosque or church. Levantine, conversely, is spoken natively and used in conversations, TV shows, films, and advertisements. This diglossia has been compared to the use of Latin as the sole written, official, liturgical, and literary language in Europe during the medieval period, while Romance languages were the spoken languages. Levantine—specifically its Palestinian dialect—is the closest Arabic variety to MSA, but Levantine and MSA are in some cases not mutually intelligible. They differ significantly in their phonology, morphology, lexicon and syntax, and exposure to MSA in the early childhood of native speakers of an Arabic variety results in a linguistic system that behaves like that of bilinguals.

Levantine speakers often call their language العامية al-ʿāmmiyya, 'slang', 'dialect', or 'colloquial' (lit. 'the language of common people'), to contrast it to Modern Standard Arabic (MSA) and Classical Arabic (الفصحى al-fuṣḥā, lit. 'the eloquent'). (Note: Native speakers of Arabic generally do not distinguish between Modern Standard Arabic (MSA) and Classical Arabic and refer to both as العربية الفصحى al-ʻArabīyah al-Fuṣḥā, lit. 'the eloquent Arabic'.) They also call their spoken language عربي ʿarabiyy, 'Arabic'. Alternatively, they identify their language by the name of their country, such as لبناني libnāni, 'Lebanese'. شامي šāmi can refer to Damascus Arabic, Syrian Arabic, or Levantine as a whole. Lebanese literary figure Said Akl led a movement to recognize the "Lebanese language" as a prestigious language instead of MSA. Most people consider Arabic to be a single language. The ISO 639-3 standard, however, classifies Arabic as a macrolanguage and Levantine as one of its languages, giving it the language code "apc".

== Code-switching and loanwords ==
Maya Diab code-switches to English from Lebanese Levantine mid-sentence

Code-switching (alternating between languages in a single conversation) between Levantine, MSA, French, and English is very common in Lebanon, often being done in both casual situations and formal situations like TV interviews. This prevalence of code-switching has led to phrases that naturally embed multiple linguistic codes being used in daily sentence, like the typical greeting "hi, كيفك؟, (Note: Transliterated as kīfak (when asked to a male) or kīfik (when asked to a female)) ça va?", which combines English, Levantine and French. Code-switching also happens in politics. For instance, not all politicians master MSA, so they rely on the Lebanese dialect of Levantine.

Additionally, many words used in the Lebanese dialect of Levantine have been borrowed from French, such as telfizyōn (French: télévision, meaning 'television'), balkōn (French: balcon, meaning 'balcony') and doktōr (French: docteur, meaning 'doctor'), and from English, such as CD, crispy, hot dog, and keyboard, with some phrases and verbs being altered to follow the syntax of Levantine Arabic, instead of English. For example, shayyik comes from the English word 'check', and sayyiv comes from the English word 'save'.

== Usage ==
=== Conversation ===
Lebanon's native language, Levantine Arabic, is the main language used in conversations. Modern Standard Arabic, despite being Lebanon's second language by number of users, is almost never used in conversations, while English and French are, even between some native speakers of Levantine. Western Armenian and Kurdish are used by their communities in Lebanon, and different sign languages are used among the Deaf community.

=== Oral media ===
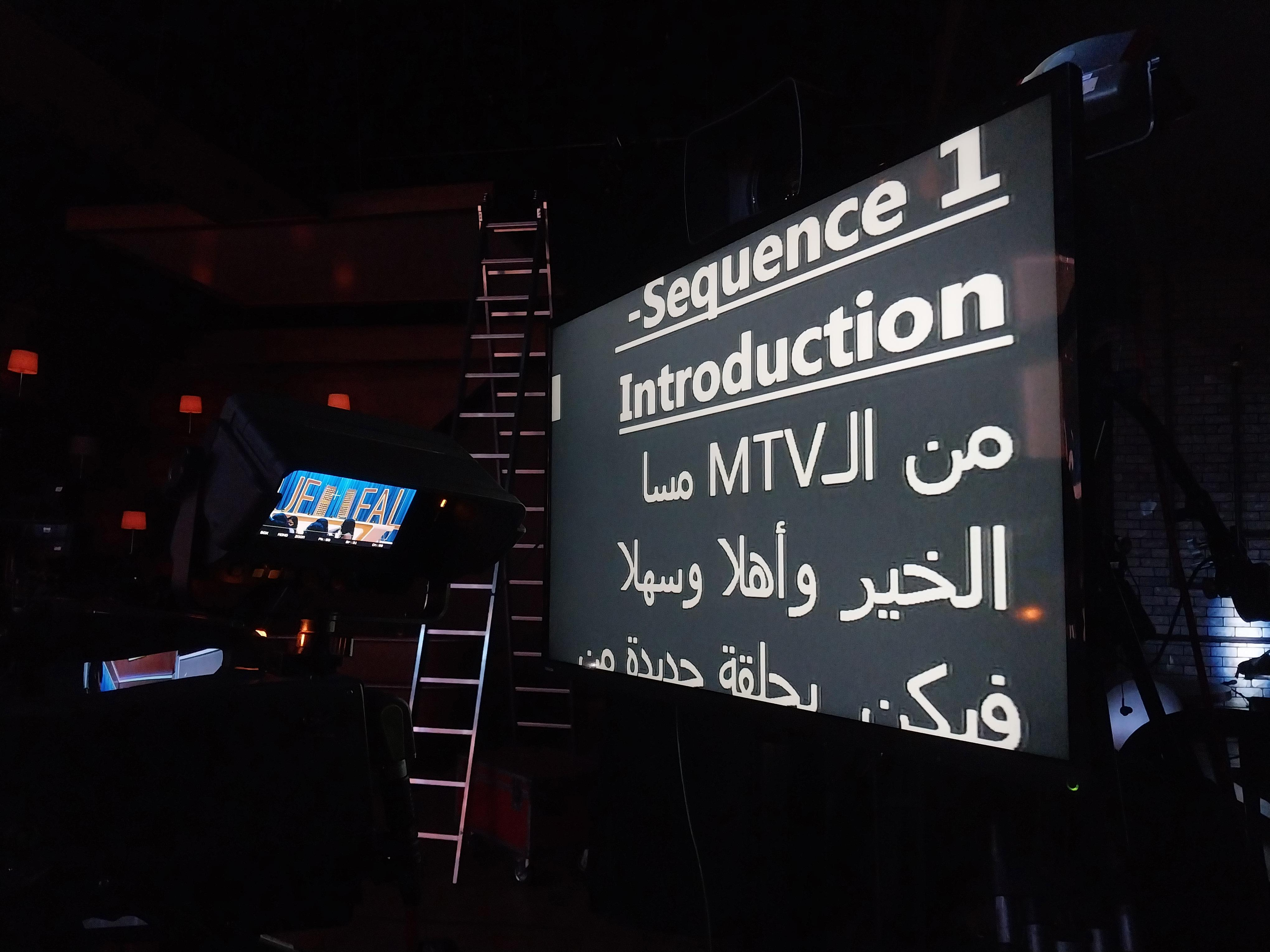
Levantine written in the Arabic script on a teleprompter used for a comedy show

Many public and formal speeches and most political talk shows are in Lebanese, not MSA. In the Arab world, most films and songs are in vernacular Arabic. Egypt was the most influential center of Arab media productions (movies, drama, TV series) during the 20th century, but Levantine is now competing with Egyptian. As of 2013, about 40% of all music production in the Arab world was in Lebanese. Lebanese television is the oldest and largest private Arab broadcast industry. Most big-budget pan-Arab entertainment shows are filmed in the Lebanese dialect in the studios of Beirut. Moreover, the Syrian dialect dominates in Syrian TV series (such as Bab al-Hara) and in the dubbing of Turkish television dramas, which are both aired in Lebanon. With the release of Secret of the Wings in 2012, Disney began re-dubbing and dubbing its films in MSA, instead of Egyptian, and in March 2013, Disney and pan-Arab television network Al Jazeera made a deal allowing the latter to distribute some of Disney's MSA-dubbed shows and films. The release of Frozen with an MSA dub and without an Egyptian one caused a controversy in the Arab world.

Lebanese zajal and other forms of oral poetry are often in Levantine. Typically, news bulletins are in MSA. On the popular television network LBCI, Arab and international news bulletins are in MSA, while the Lebanese national news broadcast is in a mix of MSA and Lebanese Arabic. Lebanese TV station OTV and some radio stations that cover news of the Armenian diaspora in Lebanon broadcast daily news bulletins in Armenian.

Lebanon used to have two francophone television stations, but they were shut down in the mid-1990s. Show hosts on television networks that are traditionally affiliated with Christians, such as MTV and LBCI, tend to use more English and French words than hosts in networks owned by Muslims, such as Future TV, Al-Manar, and NBN.

=== Writing and scripts ===
Unlike Levantine, Modern Standard Arabic has a standardized spelling in the Arabic script and is typically used in literature, official documents, newspapers, school books, and instruction leaflets. In formal media, Levantine is seldom written, except for some novels, plays, and humorous writings. Subtitles are usually in MSA, sometimes translating Arabic dialects to MSA.

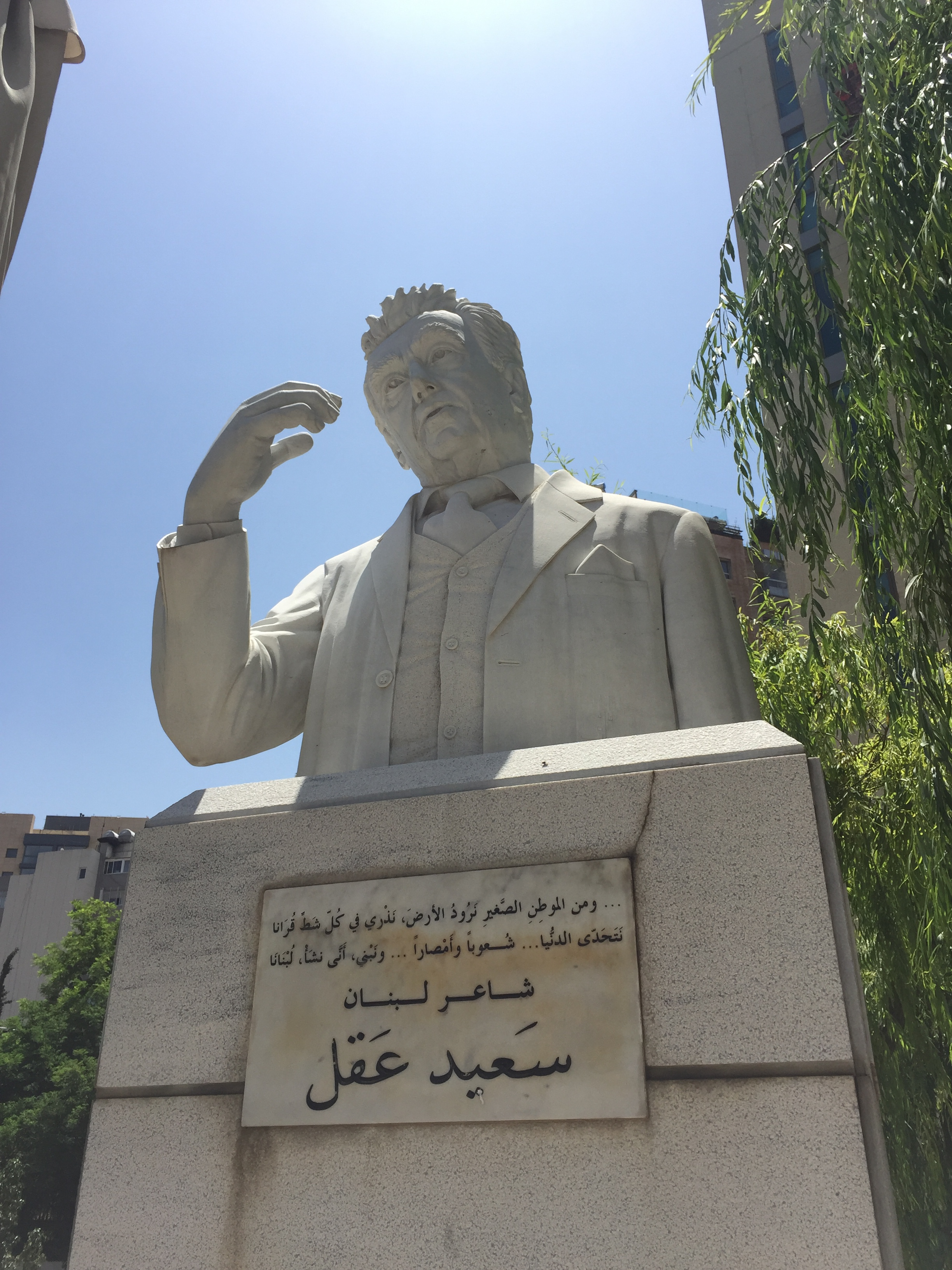
Arabic script MSA plaque on Said Akl's statue in AUST's campus, Beirut

Most Arabs struggle to write MSA correctly. On social media and when texting, they use their native variety, either in the Arabic script or Arabizi. Arabizi combines the Latin alphabet with Western Arabic numerals to make up for sounds unavailable with the Latin alphabet alone. The numbers are visually similar to the Arabic character they represent. For example, 3 represents "ع". Especially among younger generations, Arabizi is commonly used on social media and discussion forums, SMS messaging, and online chat. Arabizi initially evolved because of the lack of digital support for Arabic letters, but it is now used to save time switching keyboards and, for typists who are not proficient in an Arabic keyboard, save time typing. A 2012 study found that, when writing in Levantine on Facebook, Arabizi is more common than the Arabic script in Lebanon, while the Arabic script is more common in Syria. Several studies have reported that the complexity of Arabic orthography slows down the word identification process, but Arabizi is not always read faster than the Arabic script, depending on vowelization, the reader's gender, and other factors.

In the 1960s, Lebanese poet Said Akl—inspired by the Maltese and Turkish alphabets— designed a new Latin alphabet for Lebanese and promoted the official use of Lebanese instead of MSA, but this movement was unsuccessful.

=== Education ===
Between 1994 and 1997, the Council of Ministers passed a new National Language Curriculum that required schools to use either English or French in natural sciences and mathematics. In general, school students are exposed to two or three languages: MSA and either French, English or both. Students' native language, Levantine, is not taught in schools, although teachers commonly code-switch to Levantine.

The number of students learning in English is increasing, while those learning in French is decreasing: In 2019, 50% of school students studied in French, compared to 70% twenty years prior to that, and 55% of French-educated students chose to go to English-medium universities. Lebanon's job market is weak. Foreign language proficiency, therefore, is highly beneficial to Lebanese graduates, as it helps them find jobs abroad.

Although all language teachers face difficulties, especially in low socio-economic schools, MSA teachers' teaching resources are inferior to those of English and French, focusing mostly on classical books, as other resources are rare. Additionally, MSA teachers do not typically have the knowledge and skills in MSA to be comfortable using it as a medium of instruction. They often teach in a mix of MSA and Levantine with, for instance, the lesson read out in MSA and explained in Levantine.

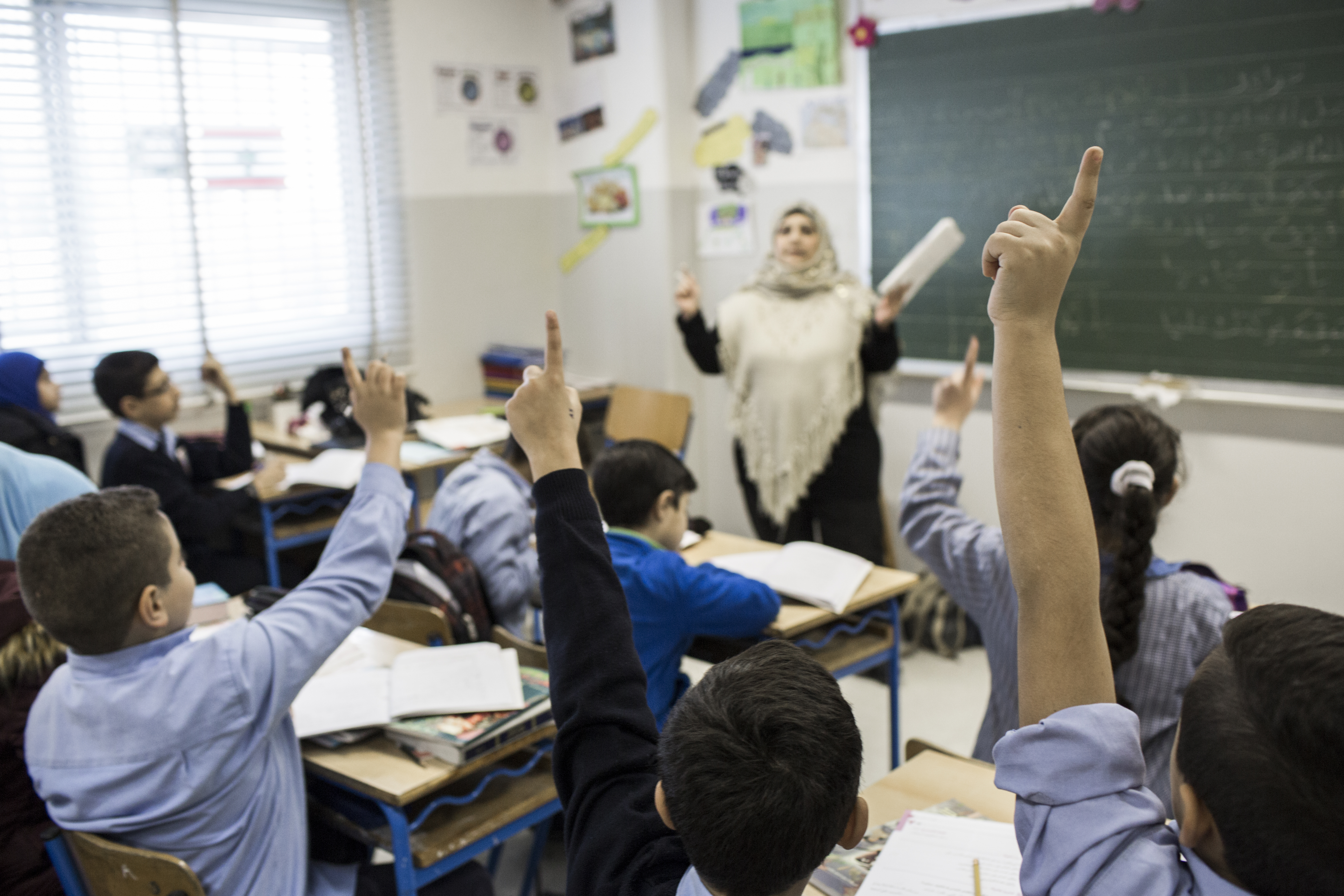
Syrian refugee students, Lebanon, 2016

Lebanese children grow up hearing Levantine and have very limited exposure to MSA before they enter school; as soon as they enter school, children are expected to learn to read and write MSA. Many young Arabs struggle with basic MSA reading and writing skills, and Arab students frequently dislike learning MSA. Additionally, Syrian refugees in Lebanon transitioning from the MSA-centric Syrian education system to the English- and French-centric Lebanese system struggle with English and French and are therefore often placed several grade levels below their age level, causing negative consequences on their psychosocial well-being. Children learn best in the language they speak at home, according to the World Bank. "When confronted by an unfamiliar language in the classroom, progress becomes next to impossible."

=== Government and law ===
Kids' chorus singing part of the Lebanese national anthem, which is in MSA

A member of the Organisation internationale de la Francophonie, Lebanon's official languages used to be French and MSA. However, after Lebanon's independence in 1943, French was no longer designated as an official language but as a recognized one. Lebanon's national anthem and all government-related announcements, documents, and publications are in MSA. French is also used, alongside MSA, on road signs, the Lebanese lira, and public buildings.

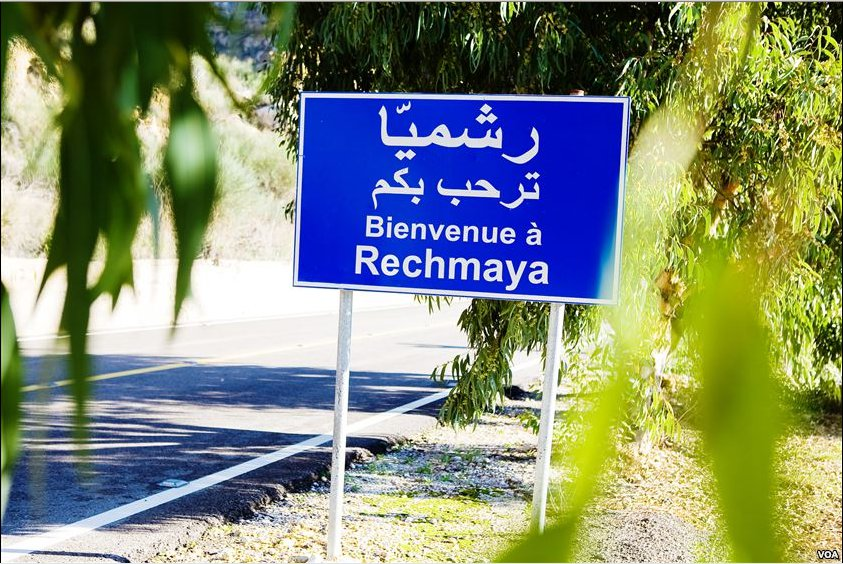
Town sign in Modern Standard Arabic and French at the entrance of Rechmaya, Lebanon

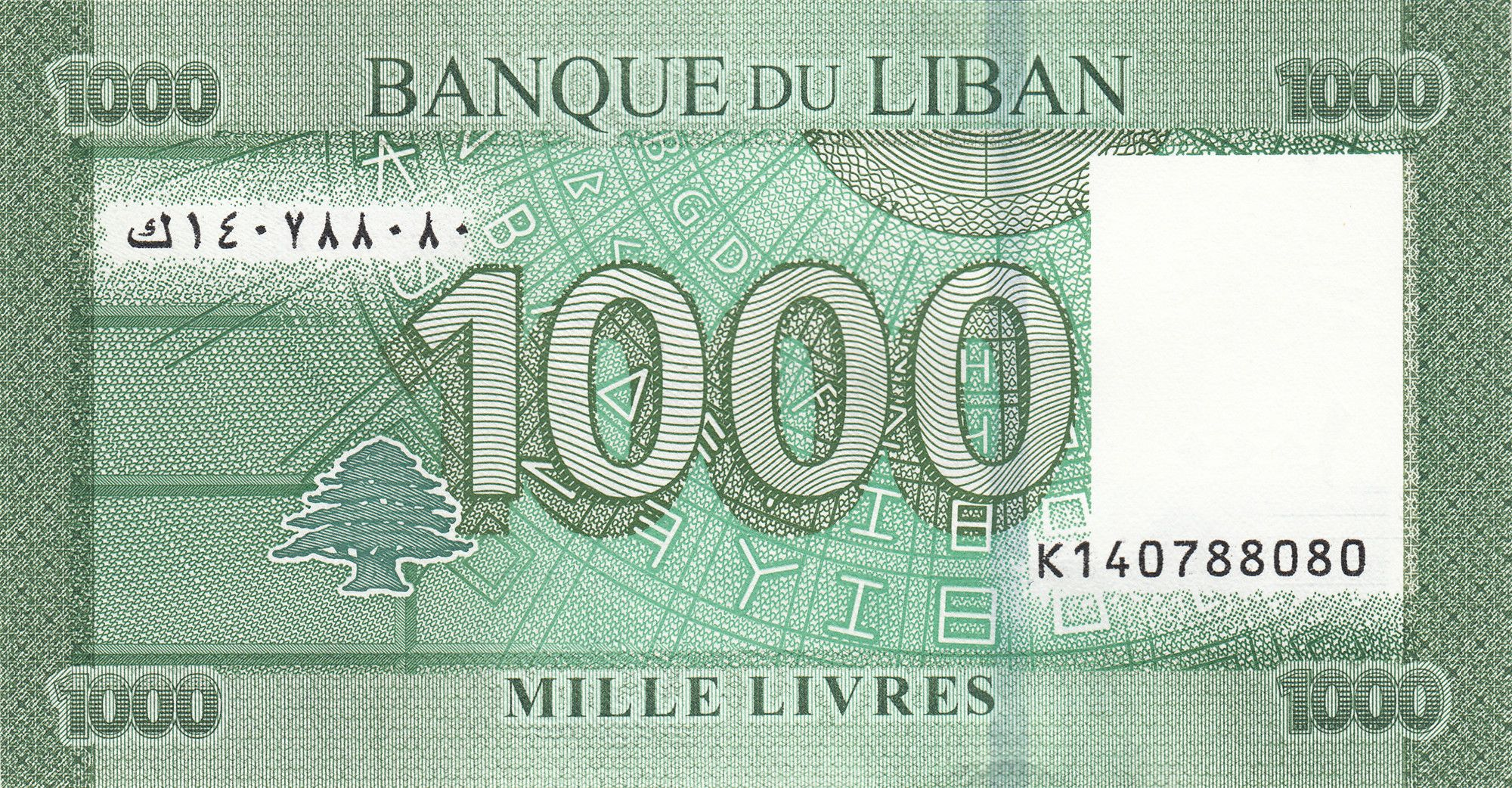
The Lebanese lira is in Modern Standard Arabic on one side and French on the other

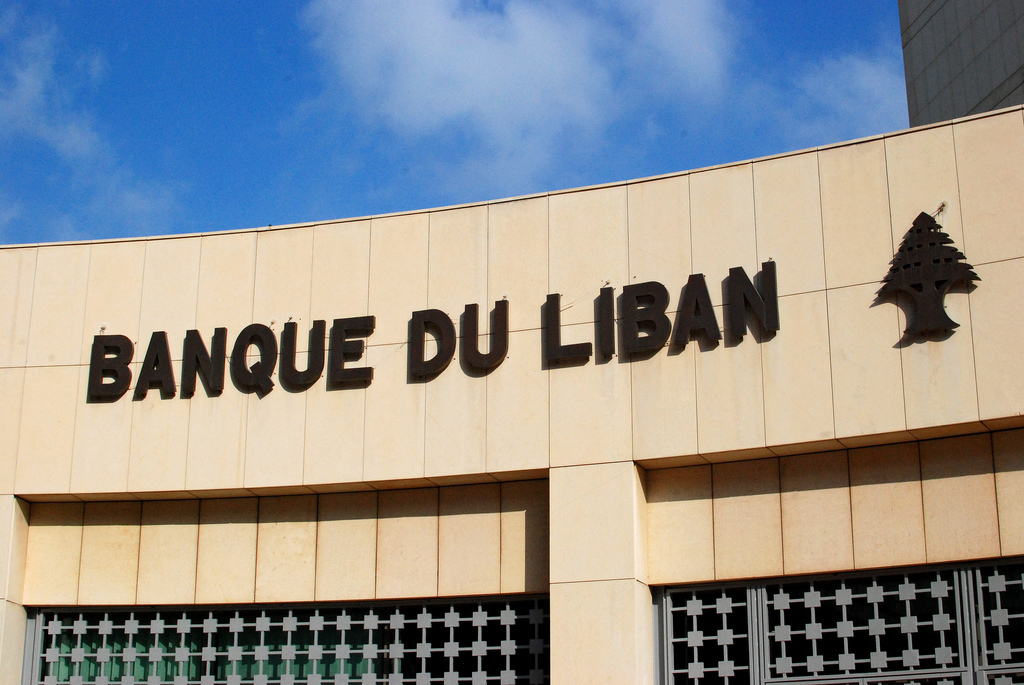
French-language inscription "Banque du Liban" on the headquarters of the Bank of Lebanon

The Lebanese dialect of Levantine is used in courtrooms, but in order to record court proceedings, the judge restates in MSA what the suspect has said, and the court recorder handwrites the judge's translation. This process, according to a report funded and led by the World Bank, "risks an edit or an omission in the restatement by the judge."

=== Brands and businesses ===
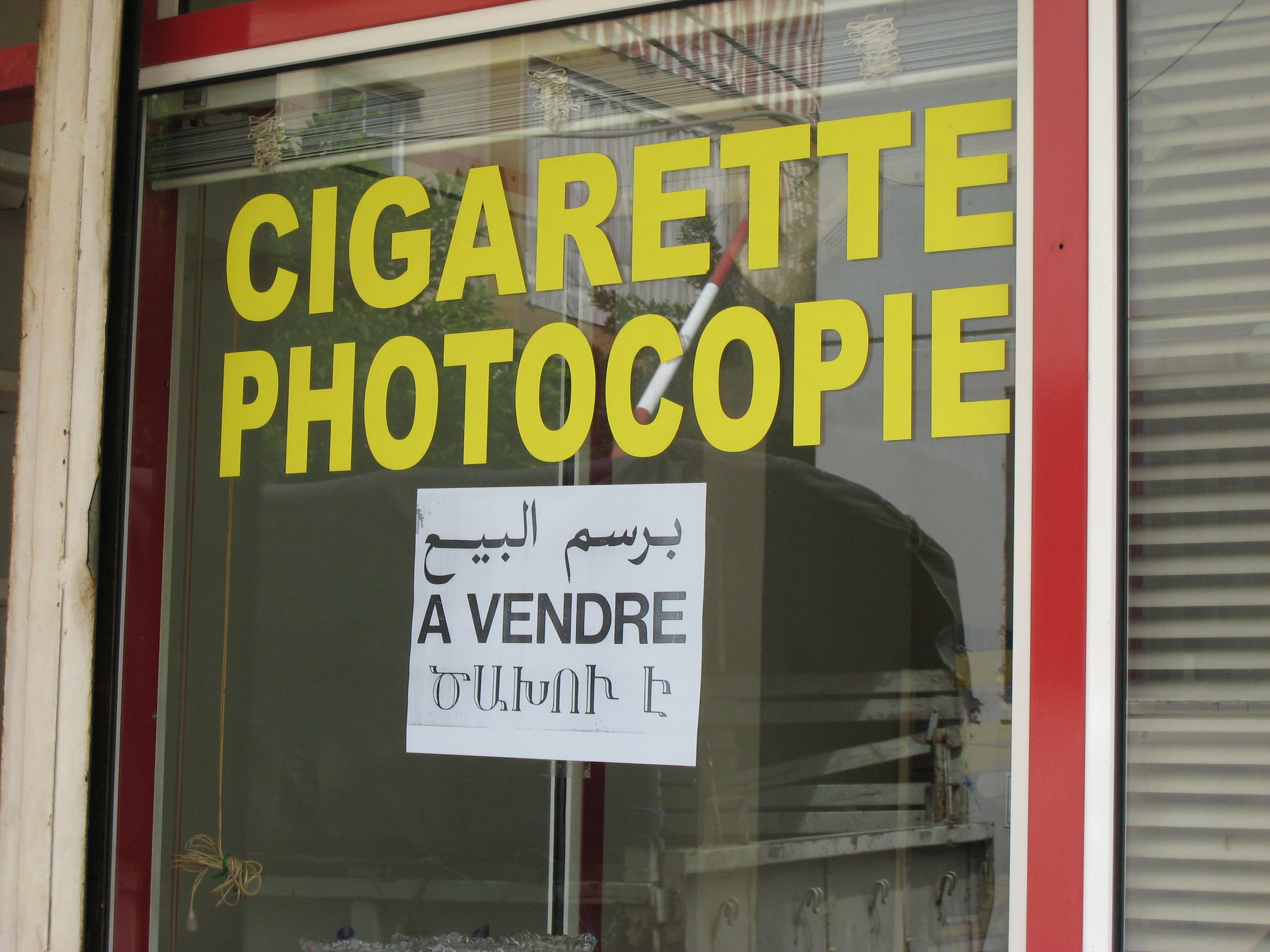
"For sale" written in MSA, French, and Armenian in Bourj Hammoud

Email communication and announcements in professional job settings are mostly through English. Of Lebanon's 34 radio stations, 11 have either French or English names. Using photographs from 2015, a 2018 study of the linguistic landscape of Lebanon's capital, Beirut, found that the Arabic script is only used in 20% of storefront's primary text (store's name) and 9% of secondary text (other information, such as opening hours). The Armenian script was absent.

== Minority language varieties ==
=== Armenian ===
Western Armenian is used between the Armenians in Lebanon, who fled to Lebanon between 1895 and 1939 for multiple reasons, most notably the Armenian genocide. (Note: According to Minority Rights Group, Cilician Catholics seeking refuge from the Armenian Orthodox Church's persecution initially came to Lebanon in the 18th century. Subsequent and bigger immigration waves arrived due to massacres by the Turks in 1895–1896 and the Armenian genocide of 1915. More arrived when France's attempt to establish an Armenian entity in Cilicia failed in 1920–1921. The last influx resulted from France ceding Alexandretta to Turkey in 1939.) In 2015, Armenians made up around 4% of Lebanon's population. Their mother tongue remains widespread, and some Armenians in Lebanon can also speak Turkish, more than a century after their ancestors left Turkey.

=== Kurdish ===
Some Kurds fled to Lebanon from violence and poverty in Turkey, but they are now dispersed in Lebanon and have largely abandoned Kurdish. Kurds in Lebanon were estimated at 70,000 in 2020, and Kurmanji's users at 23,000.

=== Aramaic ===
Aramaic (Syriac) dialects are also spoken as a first language in some Lebanese communities such as Syriac Catholics, Syriac Orthodox and Lebanese Assyrians. Classical Syriac is also used in liturgies in other communities such as Maronite Catholics.

=== Arabic Sign ===
There is no unified consensus on a specific Lebanese Sign Language used among educational establishment. Furthermore, the sign languages in the Arab world are significantly different from each other. A "unified Arabic Sign Language" was artificially created by the Council of Arab Ministers of Social Affairs (CAMSA), a committee within the Arab League. It aims "to meet the needs of integration of deaf persons into society" by giving them a similar language situation to that of hearing people. The language is used by Al Jazeera Arabic's simultaneous interpreters. Arab Deaf signers, however, negatively view the unified language, because they cannot understand it from mutual intelligibility alone, and if it replaces the Arab Deaf community's sign languages, unified Arabic sign could bound the expression of their identity. Lebanon's deaf population is estimated at 12,000.

=== Domari ===
Domari is spoken by the Dom minority in Lebanon.

== History ==
Flag of Greater Lebanon (1920–1943)

From the middle of the 2nd millennium BCE to the first half of the 1st millennium BCE, Phoenician was used as the indigenous language in Lebanon, and Egyptian and Akkadian were used in diplomacy. In the 1st millennium BCE, Aramaic became the dominant spoken language and the language of writing and administration in the Levant— where Lebanon is. Because there are no written sources, the history of Levantine Arabic before the modern period is unknown. In the early 1st century CE, a great variety of Arabic dialects were already spoken by various nomadic or semi-nomadic Arabic tribes in the Levant. These dialects were local, coming from the Hauran—and not from the Arabian Peninsula— and related to later Classical Arabic. Initially restricted to the steppe, Arabic-speaking nomads started to settle in cities and fertile areas after the Plague of Justinian in 542 CE. These Arab communities stretched from the southern extremities of the Syrian Desert to central Syria, the Anti-Lebanon Mountains, and the Beqaa Valley. The Muslim conquest of the Levant (634–640) brought Arabic speakers from the Arabian Peninsula who settled in the Levant. Arabic became the language of trade and public life in cities, while Aramaic continued to be spoken at home and in the countryside. The language shift from Aramaic to vernacular Arabic was a long process over several generations, with an extended period of bilingualism, especially among non-Muslims. Christians continued to speak Syriac for about two centuries, and Syriac remained their literary language until the 14th century. In its spoken form, Aramaic nearly disappeared, except for a few Aramaic-speaking villages, but it has left substrate influences on Levantine.

The dissolution of the Ottoman Empire in the early 20th century reduced the use of Turkish words due to Arabization and the negative perception of the Ottoman era among Arabs. Since then Lebanese Arabic has lost Turkish loanwords that were used before.

With the French Mandate for Syria and the Lebanon (1920–1946), the British protectorate over Jordan (1921–1946), and the British Mandate for Palestine (1923–1948), French and English words gradually entered Levantine Arabic.

== See also ==
- Outline of Lebanon

== Sources ==
- Al-Wer, Enam (2006). "The Arabic-speaking Middle East". In Ammon, Ulrich; Dittmar, Norbert; Mattheier, Klaus J; Trudgill, Peter (eds.). Sociolinguistics: An International Handbook of the Science of Language and Society. Vol. 3. De Gruyter. pp. 1917–1924. doi:10.1515/9783110184181.3.9.1917. ISBN 978-3-11-019987-1. OCLC 1089428643.
- Al-Wer, Enam; Jong, Rudolf (2017). "Dialects of Arabic". In Boberg, Charles; Nerbonne, John; Watt, Dominic (eds.). The Handbook of Dialectology. Wiley. pp. 523–534. doi:10.1002/9781118827628.ch32. ISBN 978-1-118-82755-0. OCLC 989950951.
- Lentin, Jérôme (2018). "The Levant". In Holes, Clive (ed.). Arabic Historical Dialectology: Linguistic and Sociolinguistic Approaches. Vol. 1. Oxford University Press. pp. 170–205. doi:10.1093/oso/9780198701378.003.0007. ISBN 978-0-19-870137-8. OCLC 1059441655.
- Liddicoat, Mary-Jane; Lennane, Richard; Abdul Rahim, Iman (2018). Syrian Colloquial Arabic: A Functional Course (Rev. 3rd ed. (online) ed.). M. Liddicoat. ISBN 978-0-646-49382-4. OCLC 732638712.
- Magidow, Alexander (2013). Towards a sociohistorical reconstruction of pre-Islamic Arabic dialect diversity (PhD thesis). University of Texas at Austin. hdl:2152/21378. OCLC 858998077.
- Versteegh, C. H. M. (2014). The Arabic Language. Edinburgh University Press. ISBN 978-0-7486-4528-2. OCLC 872980196.
- Brustad, Kristen; Zuniga, Emilie (2019). "Chapter 16: Levantine Arabic". In Huehnergard, John; Pat-El, Na'ama (eds.). The Semitic Languages (2nd ed.). Routledge. pp. 403–432. doi:10.4324/9780429025563. ISBN 978-0-415-73195-9. OCLC 1103311755. S2CID 166512720.
- Cowell, Mark W. (1964). A Reference Grammar of Syrian Arabic. Georgetown University Press. OCLC 249229002.
- Płonka, Arkadiusz (2006). "Le nationalisme linguistique au Liban autour de Sa'īd 'Aql et l'idée de langue libanaise dans la revue Lebnaan en nouvel Alphabet". Arabica (in French). 53 (4). Brill: 423–471. doi:10.1163/157005806778915100.
- Abu Elhija, Duaa (2019). A Study of Loanwords and Code Switching in Spoken and Online Written Arabic by Palestinian Israelis (PhD thesis). Indiana University. ISBN 978-1-392-15264-5. OCLC 1151841166. ProQuest 2229505512. Archived from the original on 6 March 2022.
- Shachmon, Ori; Mack, Merav (2019). "The Lebanese in Israel – Language, Religion and Identity". Zeitschrift der Deutschen Morgenländischen Gesellschaft. 169 (2). Harrassowitz Verlag: 343–366. doi:10.13173/zeitdeutmorggese.169.2.0343. JSTOR 10.13173/zeitdeutmorggese.169.2.0343. S2CID 211647029.
