= English language in Lebanon =

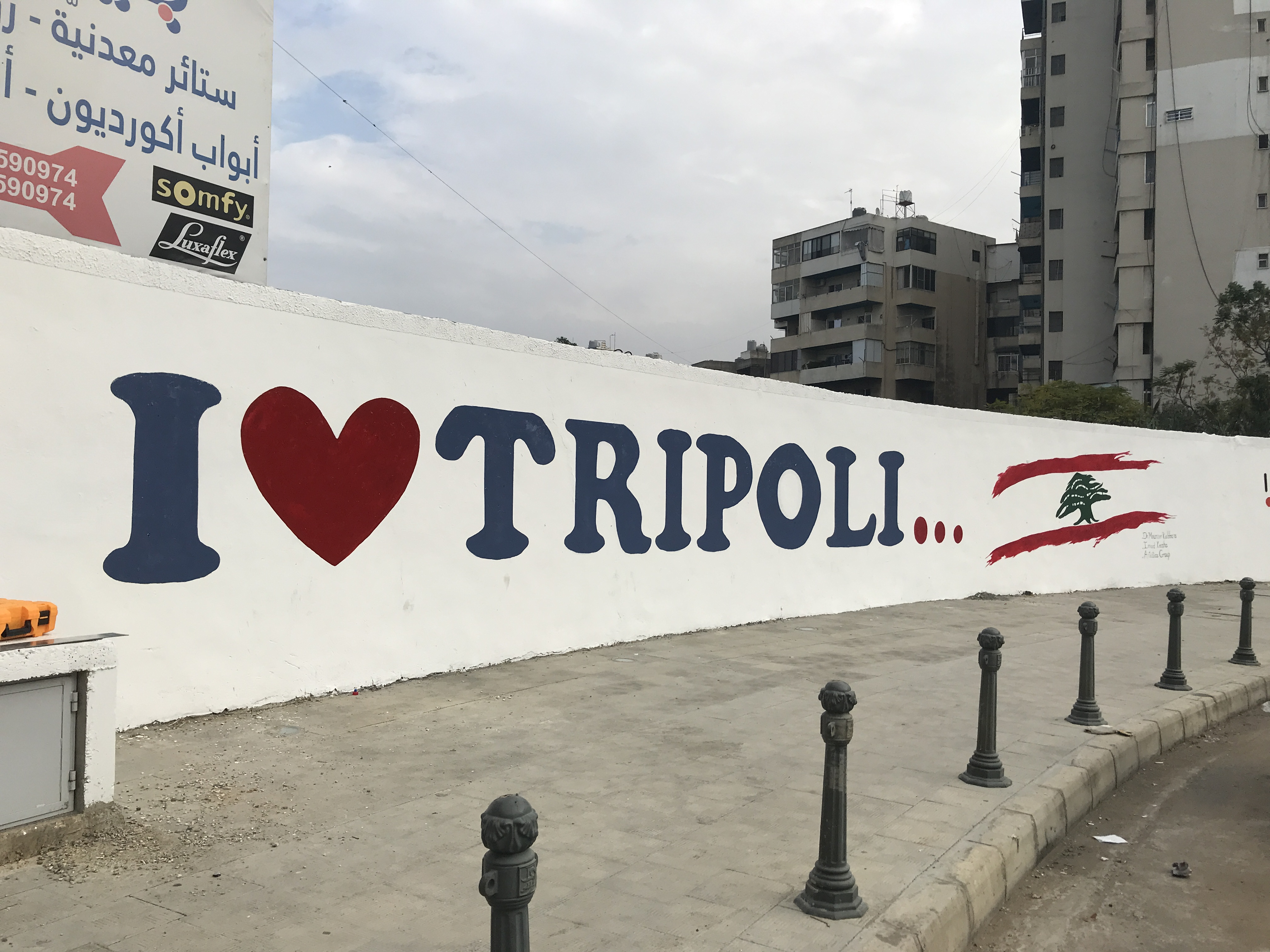
English-language sign in Tripoli, Lebanon

English is a secondary language of Lebanon, with 40% of the population saying in 2011 that they can speak it non-natively.

Most Lebanese people speak the Lebanese dialect of Levantine Arabic. English, however, is also used in Lebanon for a variety of functions, including oral and written communications, sometimes among speakers of Levantine. It is also used as a medium of instruction, especially in natural sciences and mathematics.

Many Lebanese words, such as CD, crispy, hot dog and film, have been borrowed from English, and some speakers code-switch between English, Levantine Arabic, and French in a single conversation.

== History ==
During the French rule over Lebanon from 1918 to 1946, the French language spread significantly in Lebanon and the government often writes in French alongside Modern Standard Arabic (MSA).

In addition, the use of English grew in Lebanon in the wake of American influence through oil and business interests in the Middle East. In 1972, 54% of Lebanese people said they speak French or English, including 75% of Beirut residents. Of Beirut's bilingual population, 48.5% spoke French and 26% spoke English.

Many of the Palestinians in Lebanon were also fluent in English.

In 2011, 40% of Lebanon's population said that they spoke English non-natively.

== Social significance ==
The use of English in daily life of Lebanese people reflects a desire for "modernity, coolness, and hip culture". It is also a reaction to the negativity associated with Arabic since the September 11 attacks. Many businesses advertise in English.

== Impact on Lebanese Arabic ==
=== Borrowed words ===
Lebanese Arabic has borrowed many terms from English.

Examples of Lebanese words borrowed from English
Theme	Some borrowed words
General	film, video clip, data, club, kilometer, kilogram, credit card, visa, bank
Shopping	jeans, mall, T-shirt, boots, sandals, uggs, sale
Travel	ticket, cruise, checkin, checkout, hotel, transit, boarding, gate
Sports	football, goal, penalty, tennis, volleyball, basketball, gym, dunk
Technology	internet, website, link, laptop, mouse, CD, disc, keyboard, hard drive, tablet, scanner, printer, phone, DVD
Food	diet, hamburger, hot dog, ketchup, fries, mayonnaise, ranch, crispy, wings, coke, beer, ice cream, pub, café, cafeteria, snack

Additionally, some English verbs have been borrowed and altered to follow the syntax of Levantine Arabic. For example, shayyik comes from the English word check, and sayyiv comes from the English word save.

=== Code-switching ===
Maya Diab code-switches from Lebanese to English mid-sentence

Code-switching (alternating between languages in a single conversation) between Lebanese, French, English, and MSA is so common in Lebanon, often being done in both casual situations and formal situations like TV interviews. This prevalence of code-switching has led to phrases that naturally embed multiple linguistic codes being used in everyday language, like the typical greeting "hi, كيفك؟ (Note: Transliterated as kīfak (when asked to a male) or kīfik (when asked to a female)) Ça va ?", which combines English, Lebanese, and French.

== Education ==
In most schools and universities, MSA is considered secondary and is only taught as a subject.

=== Primary and secondary education ===
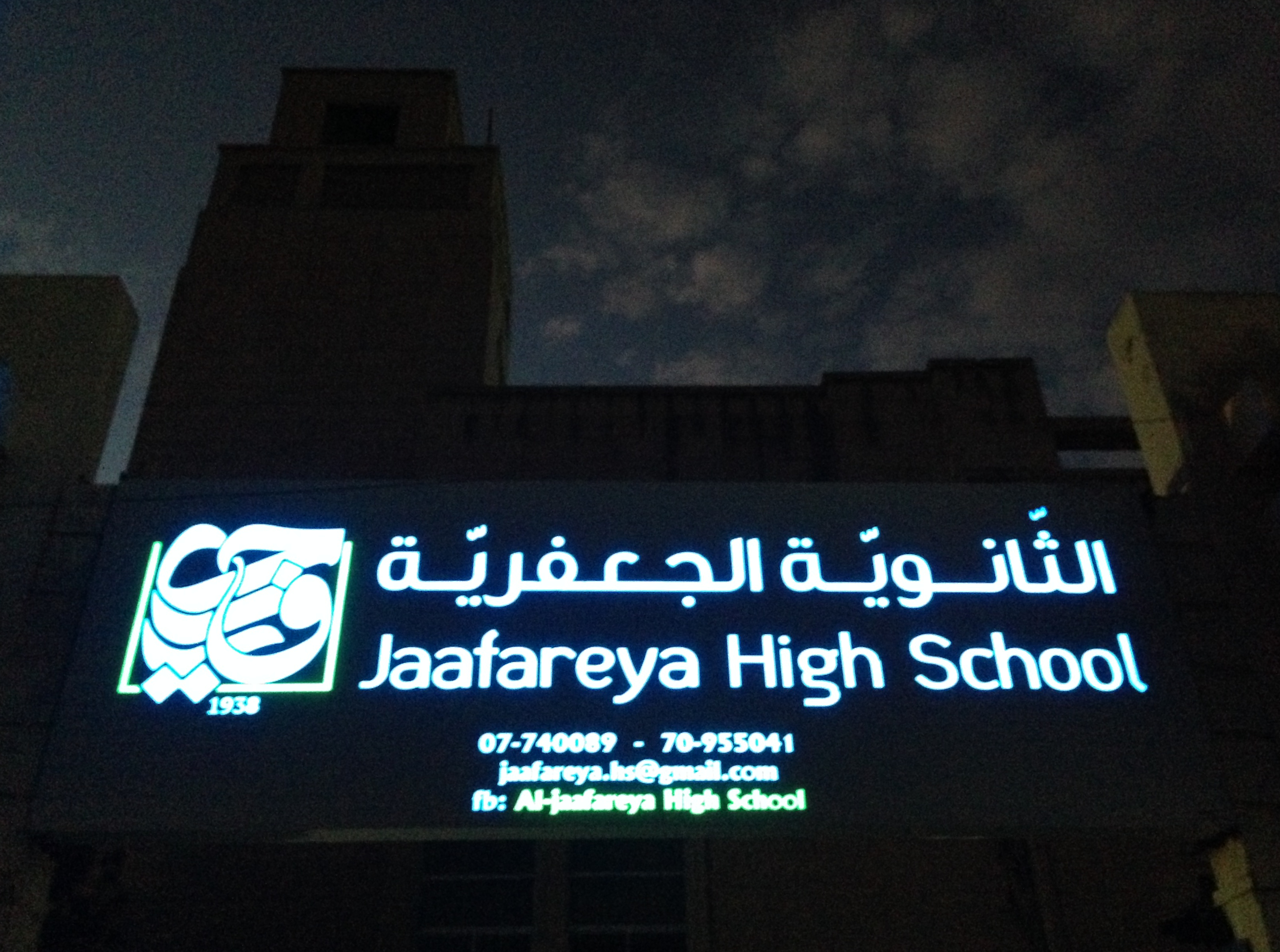
High school sign in Arabic and English

Between 1994 and 1997, the Council of Ministers passed a new National Language Curriculum that required schools to teach MSA while also using either English or French in natural sciences and mathematics. In general, school students are exposed to two or three languages.

In 2009, the Lebanese Education Ministry reported that the number of students learning French as a second language had fallen by over 10% while the number of students learning and using English keeps increasing.

=== Higher education ===
The American University of Beirut (AUB) was founded in 1866, though English only overtook MSA as the main language of instruction from 1875 onwards. Out of the 28 private universities that mushroomed between 1990 and 2021, 25 use English as a medium of instruction.

== See also ==
- French language in Lebanon
- List of countries by English-speaking population
