= Lebanese Arabic =

Levantine Arabic dialect

- اللهجة اللبنانية
- Pronunciation: [ˈʕaɾabe ləbˈneːne]
- Native to: Lebanon
- Native speakers: 4.9 million (2024)
- Language family: Afro-Asiatic: Semitic; West; Central; Arabic; Levantine; Lebanese Arabic
- Dialects: Beqaa Arabic; Iqlim-Al-Kharrub Sunni Arabic; Jdaideh Arabic; North-Central Lebanese Arabic; North Lebanese Arabic; Saida Sunni Arabic; South-Central Lebanese Arabic; South Lebanese Arabic; Sunni Beiruti Arabic
- Writing system: Arabic alphabet Arabic chat alphabet

Language codes
- ISO 639-3: (covered by Levantine Arabic apc)
- Glottolog: stan1323
- IETF: apc-LB
- Modern distribution of Levantine Arabic

Lebanese Arabic (Arabic: عَرَبِيّ لُبْنَانِيّ ʿarabiyy lubnāniyy; autonym: ʿarabe lebnēne [ˈʕaɾabe ləbˈneːne]), or simply Lebanese (Arabic: لُبْنَانِيّ lubnāniyy; autonym: lebnēne [ləbˈneːne]), is a variety of Levantine Arabic, indigenous to and primarily spoken in Lebanon, with significant linguistic influences borrowed from other Middle Eastern and European languages. Due to multilingualism and pervasive diglossia among Lebanese people (a majority of the Lebanese people are bilingual or trilingual), it is not uncommon for Lebanese people to code-switch between or mix Lebanese Arabic, French, and English in their daily speech. It is also spoken among the Lebanese diaspora.

Lebanese Arabic is a descendant of the Arabic dialects introduced to the Levant and other Arabic dialects that were already spoken in other parts of the Levant in the 7th century AD, which gradually supplanted various indigenous Northwest Semitic languages to become the regional lingua franca. As a result of this prolonged process of language shift, Lebanese Arabic possesses a significant Aramaic substratum, along with later non-Semitic adstrate influences from Ottoman Turkish, French, and English. As a variety of Levantine Arabic, Lebanese Arabic is most closely related to Syrian Arabic and shares many innovations with Palestinian and Jordanian Arabic.

== Differences from Standard Arabic ==
Lebanese Arabic shares many features with other modern varieties of Arabic. Lebanese Arabic, like many other spoken Levantine Arabic varieties, has a syllable structure very different from that of Modern Standard Arabic. While Standard Arabic can have only one consonant at the beginning of a syllable, after which a vowel must follow, Lebanese Arabic commonly has two consonants in the onset.

- Morphology: no mood or grammatical case markings.
- Number: verbal agreement regarding number and gender is required for all subjects, whether already mentioned or not.
- Vocabulary: many borrowings from other languages; most prominently Syriac-Aramaic, Western-Aramaic, Persian, Phoenician, Ottoman Turkish, French, Coptic, as well as, less significantly, from English.
- Some authors, such as the Lebanese statistician Nassim Nicholas Taleb, believe that a significant part of the Lebanese grammatical structure is due to Aramaic influences.

=== Examples ===
An interview with Lebanese singer Maya Diab; she speaks in Lebanese Arabic.

- The following example demonstrates two differences between Standard Arabic (Literary Arabic) and Spoken Lebanese Arabic: coffee (قهوة), Literary Arabic: /ˈqahwa/; Lebanese Arabic: [ˈʔahwe]. The voiceless uvular plosive /q/ corresponds to a glottal stop [ʔ], and the final vowel ([æ~a~ɐ]) commonly written with tāʾ marbūtah (ة) is raised to [e].
- As a general rule, the voiceless uvular plosive /q/ is replaced with glottal stop [ʔ], e.g. دقيقة /daqiːqa/ 'minute' becomes [dʔiːʔa]. This debuccalization of /q/ is a feature shared with Syrian Arabic, Palestinian Arabic, Egyptian Arabic, and Maltese.
  - The exception for this general rule is the Druze of Lebanon who, like the Druze of Syria and Israel, have retained the pronunciation of /q/ in the centre of direct neighbours who have replaced [q] with /ʔ/ (for example 'heart', which is /qalb/ in Literary Arabic, becomes [ʔaleb] or [ʔalb]. The use of /q/ by Druze is particularly prominent in the mountains and less so in urban areas.
- Unlike most other varieties of Arabic, a few dialects of Lebanese Arabic have retained the classical diphthongs /aj/ and /aw/ (pronounced in Lebanese Arabic as [eɪ] and [eʊ]), which were monophthongised into [eː] and [oː] elsewhere, although the majority of Lebanese Arabic dialects realize them as [oʊ] and [eɪ]. In urban dialects (i.e. Beiruti) [eː] has replaced /aj/ and sometimes medial /aː/, and [e] has replaced final /i/ making it indistinguishable with tāʾ marbūtah (ة). Also, [oː] has replaced /aw/; [o] replacing some short /u/s. In singing, the /aj/, /aw/ and medial /aː/ are usually maintained for artistic values.
- The /θ/ sound from Modern Standard Arabic is sometimes replaced with /t/ in words from MSA like /θaːnija/, (second as in the number) when it becomes /teːnje/. Other times, it may be replaced with /s/ in words like /θaːnija/ (second as in the time measurement) when it becomes /seːnje/. It is assumed that this is to maintain an audible difference between the two words which were originally homophones. In some dialects, the /θ/ sound is replaced with /t/ for both words.

=== Contentions regarding descent from Arabic ===
Lebanese literary figure Said Akl led a movement to recognize the "Lebanese language" as a distinct prestigious language and oppose it to Standard Arabic, which he considered a "dead language". Akl's idea was relatively successful among the Lebanese diaspora.

Historian and linguist Ahmad Al-Jallad has argued that modern dialects are not descendants of Classical Arabic, forms of Arabic existing before the formation of Classical Arabic being the historical foundation for the various dialects. Thus he states that, "most of the familiar modern dialects (i.e. Rabat, Cairo, Damascus, etc.) are sedimentary structures, containing layers of Arabics that must be teased out on a case-by-case basis." In essence, the linguistic consensus is that Lebanese too is a variety of Arabic.

Several non-linguist commentators, most notably the statistician and essayist Nassim Nicholas Taleb, have said that the Lebanese vernacular is not in fact a variety of Arabic at all, but rather a separate Central Semitic language descended from older languages including Aramaic; those who espouse this viewpoint suggest that a large percentage of its vocabulary consists of Arabic loanwords, and that this compounds with the use of the Arabic alphabet to disguise the language's true nature. Taleb has recommended that the language be called Northwestern Levantine or neo-Canaanite. However, this classification is at odds with the comparative method of historical linguistics; the lexicon of Lebanese, including basic lexicon, exhibits sound changes and other features that are unique to the Arabic branch of the Semitic language family, making it difficult to categorize it under any other branch, and observations of its morphology also suggest a substantial Arabic makeup. However, this is disputable as Arabic and Aramaic share many cognates, so only words proper to the Arabic language and cognates with Arabic-specific sound changes can certainly only be from Arabic. It is plausible that many words used in Lebanese Arabic today may have been influenced by their respective Aramaic and Canaanite cognates.

== Phonology ==
=== Consonants ===
Lebanese Arabic consonants
		Labial	Alveolar		Palatal	Velar	Uvular	Pharyngeal	Glottal
		Labial	plain	emphatic	Palatal	Velar	Uvular	Pharyngeal	Glottal
Nasal		m	n						
Stop	voiceless	(p)	t	tˤ	(t͡ʃ)	k	(q)		ʔ
Stop	voiced	b	d	dˤ		(ɡ)			
Fricative	voiceless	f	s	sˤ	ʃ	x		ħ	h
Fricative	voiced	(v)	z	zˤ	ʒ	ɣ		ʕ	
Tap/trill			r						
Approximant			l		j	w			

- The phonemes /p/ and /v/ are not native to Lebanese Arabic and are only found in loanwords. They are sometimes realized as [b] and [f] respectively.
- The velar stop [ɡ] occurs in native Lebanese Arabic words but is generally restricted to loanwords, especially from Turkish (e.g. جمرك gumrok, 'customs'), Persian (e.g. أرجيلة argīle, 'narghile'), Romance languages (e.g. from French سيجارة sigāra, 'cigarette'), and Cairene Arabic (e.g. جلابية jallābiyya, 'galabia'). It is realized as [k] by some speakers.
- [q] can be heard among Druze speech, alternating with a glottal [ʔ].

=== Vowels and diphthongs ===
Lebanese Arabic vowel chart.

Compared to Modern Standard Arabic, Lebanese Arabic shows notable differences in its vowel system. It has a five‑vowel inventory /a, e, i, o, u/, each with short and long counterparts which comprise /iː, uː, aː, eː, oː/, and the diphthongs /aj/ and /aw/, realized in most dialects as [eɪ] and [oʊ].

Short vowels show allophonic variation. /a/ becomes [ɑ] or [ʌ] after emphatic/back consonants (/q, ʕ, ʁ, sˤ, dˤ, tˤ/), and [æ], [ɛ], or [e] in fronting environments. /i/ tends toward [ɪ] unstressed, while /u/ surfaces as [ʊ], and both are often reduced to a central schwa [ə] in fast speech.

Long vowels remain relatively stable, though the long /aː/ is frequently fronted and raised to [eː] unless adjacent to emphatic or guttural consonants. In traditional northern dialects, /aː/ is often realized as [oː], while in traditional southern dialects, /eː/ may be diphthongized to [ɪe]. As an illustration, Lebanon (لبنان) is pronounced [ləbˈneːn], with the final vowel raised to [eː], reflecting the imāla pattern. This pronunciation serves as a recognizable shibboleth of Lebanese speech across the region.

A distinctive Lebanese feature is word‑final imāla. The vowel of tā’ marbūṭah (ـة)—[a] in MSA—is consistently raised to [e]. Final long /iː/ is likewise pronounced [e]. In addition, final short /u/ and long /uː/ are both realized as [oː].

Another feature is the insertion of a parasitic but phonemic schwa [ə] after the second consonant in many triliteral nouns to break up the cluster. For example: baḥr (بحر, “sea”) → baḥer [ˈbaħər], šams (شمس, “sun”) → shames [ˈʃaməs], ʔakl (أكل, “food”) → akel [ʔakəl] and kalb (كلب, “dog”) → kaleb [kaləb]

==== Comparison ====
This table shows the correspondence between general Lebanese Arabic vowel phonemes and their counterpart realizations in Modern Standard Arabic (MSA) and other Levantine Arabic varieties.

Lebanese Arabic	MSA	Southern	Central	Northern
/æ/	[a]	[ɑ] or [ʌ]		[ɔ] or [ɛ]
/ɪ/~[ə]	[i] or [u]	[e]	[ə]	[e] or [o]
/ʊ/~[ə]	[u]	[o] or [ʊ]	[o]	
/a/^{1}	[a]	[e]^{1}		
/ɛː/	[aː]		[æː]	[eː]
/ɔː/	[aː]		[ɑː]	[oː]
/eː/	[aː]	[a]	[e]	
/iː/	[iː]			
/i/~/e/	[iː]	[i]		
/u/	[uː]			
/eɪ/~/eː/	[aj]	[eː]		
/oʊ/~/oː/	[aw]	[oː]		

^1 After back consonants this is pronounced [ʌ] in Lebanese Arabic, Central and Northern Levantine varieties, and as [ɑ] in Southern Levantine varieties.

== Regional varieties ==
Although there is a modern Lebanese Arabic dialect mutually understood by Lebanese people, there are regionally distinct variations with, at times, unique pronunciation, grammar, and vocabulary.

Widely used regional varieties include:

- Beiruti varieties, further distributed according to neighbourhoods, the notable ones being Achrafieh variety, Basta variety, Ras Beirut variety, etc.
- Northern varieties, further distributed regionally, the most notable ones being Tripoli variety, Zgharta variety, Bsharri variety, Koura variety, Akkar variety.
- Southern varieties, with notable ones being the Tyre and Bint Jbeil varieties.
- Beqaa varieties, further divided into varieties, the notable ones being Zahlé and Baalbek-Hermel varieties.
- Mount Lebanon varieties, further divided into regional varieties like the Keserwan variety, the Matin dialect, Shouf variety, etc.

Even in the medieval era, the geographer Yaqut al-Hamawi wrote that: "They say that in the Lebanon district there are spoken seventy dialects, and no one people understands the language of the other, except through an interpreter."

== Writing system ==
Lebanese Arabic is rarely written, except in novels where a dialect is implied or in some types of poetry that do not use classical Arabic at all. Lebanese Arabic is also utilized in many Lebanese songs, theatrical pieces, local television and radio productions, and very prominently in zajal.

Formal publications in Lebanon, such as newspapers, are typically written in Modern Standard Arabic, French, or English.

While Arabic script is usually employed, informal usage such as online chat may mix and match Latin letter transliterations. The Lebanese poet Said Akl proposed the use of the Latin alphabet but did not gain wide acceptance. Whereas some works, such as Romeo and Juliet and Plato's Dialogues have been transliterated using such systems, they have not gained widespread acceptance. Yet, now, most Arabic web users, when short of an Arabic keyboard, transliterate the Lebanese Arabic words in the Latin alphabet in a pattern similar to the Said Akl alphabet, the only difference being the use of digits to render the Arabic letters with no obvious equivalent in the Latin alphabet.

There is still today no generally accepted agreement on how to use the Latin alphabet to transliterate Lebanese Arabic words. However, Lebanese people are now using Latin numbers while communicating online to make up for sounds not directly associable to Latin letters. This is especially popular over text messages and apps such as WhatsApp. Examples:

- 2 for ء or ق (qaf is often pronounced as a glottal stop)
- 3 for ع
- 5 or kh for خ
- 7 for ح
- 8 or gh for غ

In 2010, The Lebanese Language Institute released a Lebanese Arabic keyboard layout and made it easier to write Lebanese Arabic in a Latin script, using unicode-compatible symbols to substitute for missing sounds.

=== Said Akl's orthography ===
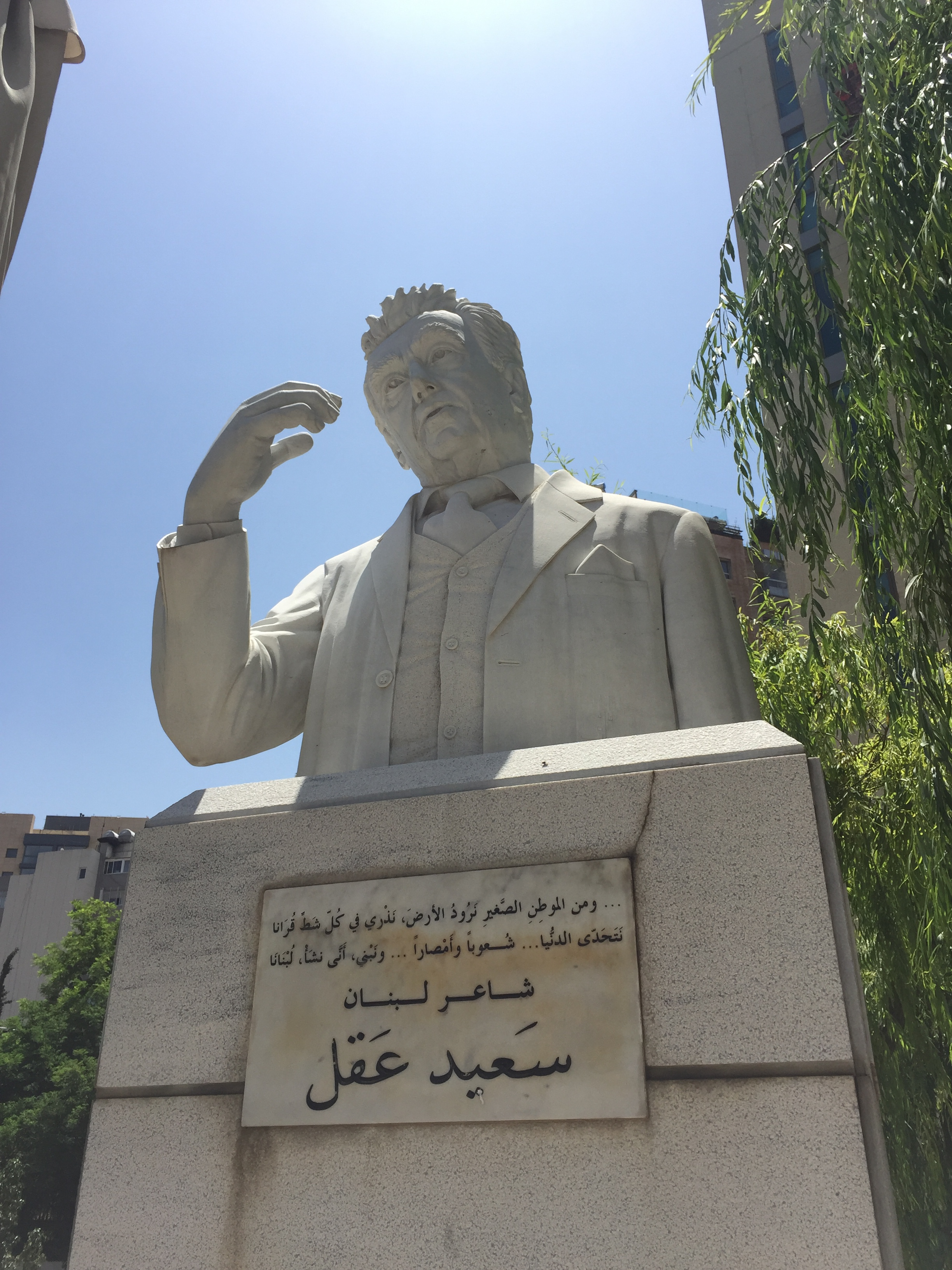
Said Akl's statue in the American University of Science and Technology's campus in Beirut, Lebanon

Said Akl, the poet, philosopher, writer, playwright and language reformer, designed an alphabet for the Lebanese language using the Latin alphabet in addition to a few newly designed letters and some accented Latin letters to suit the Lebanese phonology in the following pattern:

- Capitalization and punctuation are used normally the same way they are used in French and English
- Some written consonant-letters, depending on their position, inherited a preceding vowel. As L and T.
- Emphatic consonants are not distinguished in spelling by Said Akl's method, with the exception of /zˤ/ represented by ƶ. Probably Said Akl did not acknowledge any other emphatic consonant.
- Stress is not marked.
- Long vowels and geminated consonants are represented by double letters.
- ꞓ which represents /ʔ/ (Arabic hamza) was written even initially.
- All of the basic Latin alphabet are used, in addition to other diacriticized ones. Most of the letters loosely represent their IPA counterparts, with some exceptions:

Letter	Corresponding phoneme(s)	Notes
a	/a/, /ɑ/	
aa	/aː/, /ɑː/	
c	/ʃ/	
ꞓ	/ʔ/	The actual diacritic is a diagonal stroke crossing the bottom left of the letter
g	/ɣ/	
i	/ɪ/, /i/	Represents /i/ word-finally
ii	/iː/	
j	/ʒ/	
k	/χ/	
q	/k/	
u	/ʊ/, /u/	Represents /u/ word-finally
uu	/uː/	
x	/ħ/	
y	/j/	
ý	/ʕ/	The actual diacritic is a horizontal stroke going from the top of the upper-left spoke of the letter towards the top-center of the letter-space
ƶ	/zˤ/	

Roger Makhlouf largely uses Akl's alphabet in his Lebanese-English Lexicon.

== Bibliography ==
- Feghali, Maksoud Nayef (1999). Spoken Lebanese. Parkway Publishers. OCLC 43497631.
- Feghali, Michel T. (1928). Syntaxe des parlers arabes actuels du Liban. Paris: Impr. nationale. OCLC 580564758.
- Elie Kallas, 'Atabi Lebnaaniyyi. Un livello soglia per l'apprendimento del neoarabo libanese, Cafoscarina, Venice, 1995.
- Angela Daiana Langone, Btesem ente lebneni. Commedia in dialetto libanese di Yahya Jaber, Università degli Studi La Sapienza, Rome, 2004.
- Jérome Lentin, "Classification et typologie des dialectes du Bilad al-Sham", in Matériaux Arabes et Sudarabiques n. 6, 1994, 11–43.
- Płonka, Arkadiusz (2004). L'idée de langue libanaise d'après Sa'ïd 'Aql. Geuthner. ISBN 2-7053-3739-3. OCLC 57573072.
- Płonka, Arkadiusz (2006). "Le nationalisme linguistique au Liban autour de Sa'īd 'Aql et l'idée de langue libanaise dans la revue Lebnaan en nouvel Alphabet". Arabica (in French). 53 (4). Brill: 423–471. doi:10.1163/157005806778915100.
- Franck Salameh, "Language, Memory, and Identity in the Middle East", Lexington Books, 2010.
- Abdul-Karim, K. 1979. Aspects of the Phonology of Lebanese Arabic. University of Illinois at Urbana-Champaign Doctoral Dissertation.
- Bishr, Kemal Mohamed Aly. 1956. A grammatical study of Lebanese Arabic. (Doctoral dissertation, University of London; 470pp.)
- Choueiri, Lina. 2002. Issues in the syntax of resumption: restrictive relatives in Lebanese Arabic. Ann Arbor: UMI. (Doctoral dissertation, University of Los Angeles; xi+376pp.)
- Makki, Elrabih Massoud. 1983. The Lebanese dialect of Arabic: Southern Region. (Doctoral dissertation, Georgetown University; 155pp.)
