= Rechmaya =

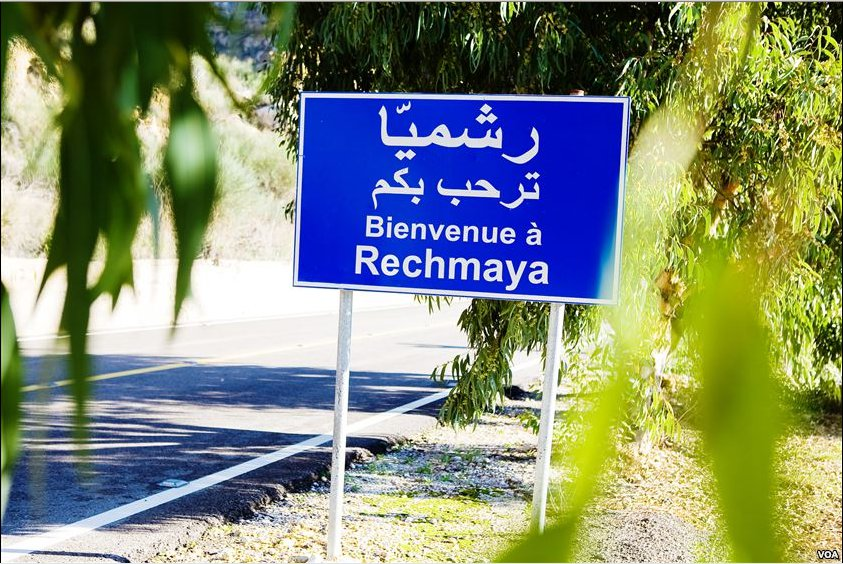
- Road sign for Rechmaya in Arabic and French

- Location in Lebanon
- Coordinates: 33.7370°N 35.5990°E
- Country: Lebanon
- Governorate: Mount Lebanon
- District: Chouf

Rechmaya (Arabic: رشميا), is a village in the Aley District of Lebanon. Bechara El Khoury, Lebanon's first president after independence, was born in Rechmaya on August 10, 1890. The town is located in a mountainous area.

== Etymology ==
The name Rechmaya is from Aramaic "Resh Mayya" which means "waterhead."
