= Levantine Arabic vocabulary =

Vocabulary of Levantine Arabic

Levantine Arabic vocabulary is the vocabulary of Levantine Arabic, the variety of Arabic spoken in the Levant. (Note: Also known as the region of Syria.)

== Overview ==
The lexicon of Levantine is overwhelmingly Arabic. Many words, such as verbal nouns (also called gerunds or masdar) are derived from a verb root. For instance مدرسة madrase 'school', from درس daras 'to study, to learn'.

However, it also includes layers of ancient indigenous languages: Aramaic (particularly Western Aramaic), classical Hebrew (Biblical and Mishnaic), Canaanite, Persian, Greek, and Latin. Since the early modern period, Levantine has borrowed from Turkish (due to the region's long history under the Ottoman Empire) as well as European languages, mainly English (notably in the fields of science and technology) and French (in Syria and Lebanon due to the French mandate), but also German, and Italian. With the establishment of Israel in 1948, there has also been a significant influence of Modern Hebrew on the Palestinian dialect spoken by Arab Israelis. Loanwords are gradually replaced with words of Arabic root. For instance, borrowings from Ottoman Turkish that were common in the 20th century have been largely replaced by Arabic words after the end of Ottoman Syria.

== Lexical distance from MSA ==
An analysis of the spoken lexicon of five-year-old native Palestinian speakers concluded that:

- 40% of the words were unique to Palestinian and not present in MSA;
- 40% of the spoken Palestinian words were related to terms in MSA but were different in between 1 and 6 phonological parameters (sound change, addition, or deletion);
- 20% of the words were identical in Palestinian and MSA.

Levantine words coming from Classical Arabic have undergone three common phonological processes:

- Regressive vowel harmony: The first vowel /a/ has changed to /u/ in harmony with the following vowel /u/,
- Final vowel deletion: The final vowel /u/ is deleted, and
- Initial consonant addition: A voiced bilabial consonant is often added before present verb prefixes. It is /b/ in all forms except 1st person plural, where it is /m/.

Despite these differences, three scientific papers concluded, using various natural language processing techniques, that Levantine dialects (and especially Palestinian) were the closest colloquial varieties, in terms of lexical similarity, to MSA: one compared MSA to two Algerian dialects, Tunisian, Palestinian, and Syrian and found 38% of common words between Syrian and MSA and 52% between Palestinian and MSA; another compared MSA to Egyptian, Levantine, Gulf, and North African Arabic; and the other compared MSA to Algerian, Tunisian, Palestinian, Syrian, Jordanian, and Egyptian and found that Levantine dialects were very similar to each other and between 0.4 and 0.5 similarity between MSA and Palestinian.

== Aramaic substrate ==
Aramaic influence is significant, especially in rural areas. Aramaic words underwent morphophonemic adaptation when they entered Levantine; over time, it has become difficult to identify them. They belong to different fields of everyday life such as seasonal agriculture, housekeeping, tools and utensils, and Christian religious terms. Aramaic is still spoken in the Syrian villages of Maaloula, al-Sarkha, and Jubb'adin; near them, Aramaic borrowings are more frequent.

Examples of words of Aramaic origin include: شوب šōb 'heat'; شلح šalaḥ 'to undress'; بسّط bassaṭ 'to stretch'. Aramaic also influenced the syntax of Levantine dialects. For instance, the usage of li- as a direct object marker is a typically Aramaic construction: ʼeltillo la-ebno 'I told his son', šeft(u) l-xayyak 'I saw your brother', ʻammo la-flān 'the brother of somebody'.

== Loanwords ==
=== Learned borrowings from MSA ===
Levantine often borrows learned words from MSA, particularly in more formal settings. In modern and religious borrowings from MSA the original MSA pronunciation is usually preserved. For instance, قرآن (Quran) is only pronounced /qurʾān/.

=== From English ===
Contacts between Levantine and English started during the nineteenth century when the British ran academic and religious institutions in the Levant. More influence of English occurred during the British protectorate over Jordan and the British Mandate for Palestine. However, the borrowing process was low at the time as the number of British personnel was very small. Over the last few decades, English contact with Levantine has gained increasing momentum, leading to the introduction of many loanwords, particularly in the contexts of technology and entertainment.

=== From French ===
Many French loanwords exist in Levantine, especially in Lebanese and to a lesser extent Syria due to the French Mandate for Syria and the Lebanon.

Example of common French loanwords in Lebanese
French original word	French pronunciation	French meaning	Lebanese meaning	Lebanese
abat-jour	/a.ba.ʒuʁ/	lampshade		/ɑ.bɑ.ʒuɾ/ أباجور
antenne	/ɑ̃.tɛn/	antenna		/ɑn.tˤen/
baffle	/bafl/	speaker		/bɑfl/
bonjour	/bɔ̃.ʒuʁ/	good morning		/bon.ʒuɾ/ بونجور
chauffeur	/ʃo.fœʁ/	driver		/ʃu.feɾ/ شوفير
douche	/duʃ/	shower		/duʃ/ دوش
échappement	/e.ʃap.mɑ̃/	exhaust pipe		/æ.ʃɘk.mɑn/ أشكمون
garçon	/ɡaʁ.sɔ̃/	waiter		/ɡɑɾ.sˤon/ جرسون
maillot	/ma.jo/	swimsuit		/mæj.jo/ مايو
mayonnaise	/ma.jɔ.nɛz/	mayonnaise		/mæj.jo.nez/ مايونيز
mécanicien	/me.ka.ni.sjɛ̃/	mechanic		/mɘ.kæ.nɘs.jen/-
numéro	/nymeʁo/	number	license plate	/nom.ɾɑ/
pantalon	/pɑ̃.ta.lɔ̃/	pants		/bɑn.tˤɑ.lon/ بانتالون
pharmacie	/faʁ.ma.si/	pharmacy		/fæɾ.mæ.ʃi.jæ/ فرمشيَّا

Other loanwords include ascenseur (elevator) and chaise longue (any reclining chair, such as a sun lounger).

=== From Ottoman Turkish ===
The vast majority of Turkish loans in Levantine date from the Ottoman Empire, which dominated the Levant and a large part of the Arab world for about four hundred years. The dissolution of the Ottoman Empire resulted in a rapid and drastic decrease in Turkish words due to the Arabization of the language and the negative perception of the Ottoman era among Arabs. However, Arabic-speaking minorities in Turkey (mainly in the Hatay Province) are still influenced by Turkish. Many Western words entered Arabic through Ottoman Turkish as Turkish was the main language for transmitting Western ideas into the Arab world. There are about 3,000 Turkish borrowings in Syrian Arabic, mostly in administration and government, army and war, crafts and tools, house and household, dress, and food and dishes.

Example of Levantine terms derived from Ottoman Turkish
Ottoman Turkish	Modern Turkish	Meaning	Levantine
قازمه kazma	kazma	pick, mattock	قزمة qazma
طبانجه tabanca	tabanca	pistol	طبنجة ṭabanje
طوغری doğrı	doğru	straight ahead	دغري duḡri
تپسی tepsi	tepsi	tray, ashtray	تبسية təbsiyye / تبسة təbse
اوطه oda	oda	room	أوضة ʾōḍa
باشلامق başlamak	başlamak	to begin	بلّش ballaš

=== From Modern Hebrew ===
Palestinian Israelis use many Modern Hebrew loanwords. Modern Hebrew is now the main source of innovation in Palestinian Arabic in Israel, including for words originally derived from English. Most of the borrowed items are nouns and many are borrowed without any change. Hebrew loanwords can be written in Hebrew, Arabic, or Latin script, depending on the speaker and the context. Code-switching between Levantine and Hebrew is frequent. In one study, 2.7% of all words in conversations on WhatsApp and Viber were Hebrew borrowings, mostly nouns from the domains of education, technology, and employment.

Example of common Hebrew borrowed words in Palestinian Israeli dialect
Palestinian (Arabic script)	Palestinian pronunciation (IPA)	Original Hebrew word	Hebrew transliteration	English meaning
الكورس	[alkors]	קורס	kurs	the course
لسمستر	[lasimister]	סמסטר	seméster	for semester
ترجول	[tirgo:l]	תרגול	tirgúl	practice
ھودعوت	[hodaʕo:t]	הודעה	hoda'á	SMS
كلیتاه	[klitah]	קליטה	klitá	mobile reception
بلفون	[bilifon]	פלאפון	pélefon	mobile phone (Genericized trademark of Pelephone)
السدور	[ilsido:r]	סידור	sidúr	the work schedule
حوفش	[ћofiʃ]	חופש	khófesh	break from work
عیسیك	[ʕesik]	עסק	'ések	business
بجروت	[bigro:t]	בגרות	bagrút	comprehensive high school final exam (Bagrut certificate)
ھرتسآه	[hartsaˀah]	הרצאה	hartsa'á	lecture
ھشتلموت	[hiʃtalmo:t]	השתלמות	hishtalmút	extension of study
مزجان	[mazga:n]	מזגן	mazgán	air conditioner
شوئیف	[ʃuˀev]	שואב	sho'ev	vacuum cleaner
شلاط	[ʃala:tˁ]	שלט	shalát	remote control
رأیون	[riˀajo:n]	ריאיון	re'ayon	interview
المعسیك	[ilmaʕsik]	מעסיק	ma'asik	employer
بتسوییم	[bitsuj:m]	פיצויים	pitsúyim	compensation payment

== Sources ==
- Aldrich, Matthew (8 July 2017). Levantine Arabic Verbs: Conjugation Tables and Grammar. Lingualism. ISBN 978-0-9986411-3-3. OCLC 1083130827.
- Aldrich, Matthew (9 February 2021). Palestinian Arabic verbs: conjugation tables and grammar. Lingualism. ISBN 978-1-949650-27-3. OCLC 1249659359.
- Al-Masri, Mohammad (28 August 2015). Colloquial Arabic (Levantine): The Complete Course for Beginners. Colloquial Series. London: Routledge. ISBN 978-0-415-72685-6. OCLC 919431090.
- Brustad, Kristen; Zuniga, Emilie (6 March 2019). "Chapter 16: Levantine Arabic". In Huehnergard, John; Pat-El, Na‘ama (eds.). The Semitic languages (2nd ed.). London & New York: Routledge Taylor & Francis Group. pp. 403–432. doi:10.4324/9780429025563. ISBN 978-0-429-02556-3. S2CID 166512720.
- Cowell, Mark W. (March 2004). A Reference Grammar of Syrian Arabic. Georgetown University Press (published 1964). ISBN 1-58901-003-5. OCLC 249229002.
- Elihai, Yohanan (2011a). Speaking Arabic: a course in conversational Eastern (Palestinian) Arabic. Book 1. Jerusalem: Minerva. ISBN 978-965-7397-16-9. OCLC 1076023526.
- Elihai, Yohanan (2011b). Speaking Arabic: a course in conversational Eastern (Palestinian) Arabic. Book 2. Jerusalem: Minerva. ISBN 978-965-7397-17-6. OCLC 1073572583.
- Elihai, Yohanan (2010). Speaking Arabic: a course in conversational Eastern (Palestinian) Arabic. Book 3. Jerusalem: Minerva. ISBN 978-965-7397-18-3. OCLC 755643505.
- Elihai, Yohanan (2011c). Speaking Arabic: a course in conversational Eastern (Palestinian) Arabic. Book 4. Jerusalem: Minerva. ISBN 978-965-7397-19-0. OCLC 755644028.
- Elihay, J. (2012). The Olive Tree Dictionary: A Transliterated Dictionary of Eastern Arabic (Palestinian) (2nd ed.). Jerusalem: Minerva. ISBN 978-965-7397-06-0. OCLC 825044014.
- Lentin, Jérôme (2018). "The Levant". In Holes, Clive (ed.). Arabic Historical Dialectology: Linguistic and Sociolinguistic Approaches. Oxford University Press. pp. 170–205. doi:10.1093/oso/9780198701378.003.0007. ISBN 978-0-19-870137-8. OCLC 1059441655.
- Liddicoat, Mary-Jane; Lennane, Richard; Abdul Rahim, Iman (June 2018). Syrian Colloquial Arabic: A Functional Course (Rev. 3rd ed. (online) ed.). M. Liddicoat. ISBN 978-0-646-49382-4. OCLC 732638712.
- Nammur-Wardini, Rita (6 May 2011). L'arabe libanais de poche (in French). Assimil. ISBN 978-2-7005-0357-9. OCLC 758528127.
- Stowasser, Karl (2004). A Dictionary of Syrian Arabic: English-Arabic. Georgetown University Press. ISBN 978-1-58901-105-2. OCLC 54543156.
- Tiedemann, Fridrik E. (26 March 2020). The Most Used Verbs in Spoken Arabic: Jordan & Palestine (4th ed.). Amman: Great Arabic Publishing. ISBN 978-1734460407.
