= Classification of Arabic languages =

Genealogical position of Arabic varieties

North Arabian
- South Central Semitic; Arabic
- Geographic distribution: North Africa, Middle East, Malta
- Linguistic classification: Afro-Asiatic: Semitic; West Semitic; Central Semitic; North Arabian
- Proto-language: Proto-Arabic

Language codes
- Glottolog: arab1394

In linguistics, the Arabic language can be divided into several historical and geographical categories, namely Old Arabic (spoken in pre-Islamic times), the literary varieties Classical Arabic and Modern Standard Arabic, and the various modern dialects.

Classifying the position of Arabic within the group of Semitic languages has long been an active area of research.

== Views on Arabic classification ==
Historically, the Semitic languages originated in a relatively small geographic area (Syria, Mesopotamia, and Arabia) and often spoken in contiguous regions. Permanent contacts between the speakers of these languages facilitated borrowing between them. Borrowing disrupts historical processes of change and makes it difficult to reconstruct the genealogy of languages.

Traditionally, Arabic was classified as belonging to the Southwest Semitic group of languages, based on some affinities with Modern South Arabian and Geʽez.

Traditional classification of the Semitic languages

Proto-Semitic
West Semitic	East Semitic (Akkadian)
Northwest Semitic	Southwest Semitic
Canaanite (Hebrew, Phoenician)	Aramaic	Arabic	South Arabian	Ethiopic

Most scholars eventually rejected the Southwest Semitic subgrouping because it is not supported by any linguistic innovations and because shared features with South Arabian and Ethiopic were only due to areal diffusion.

In 1976, linguist Robert Hetzron classified Arabic as a Central Semitic language:

The genealogy of the Semitic languages (Hetzron 1974, 1976)

Proto-Semitic
West Semitic	East Semitic (Akkadian)
South Semitic	Central Semitic
Aramaic	Arabo-Canaanite
Ethiopic	Epigraphic South Arabian	Modern South Arabian	Arabic	Canaanite

John Huehnergard, Aaron D. Rubin, and other scholars suggested subsequent modifications to Hetzron's model:

Huehnergard & Pat-El's classification of Semitic languages

Proto-Semitic
West Semitic	East Semitic (Akkadian)
Ethio-Semitic	Modern South Arabian	Central Semitic
North Arabian	Ancient Arabian	Northwest Semitic
Arabic-Safaitic	Arameo-Canaanite	Ugaritic	Samalian
Arabic vernaculars (inc. Levantine)	Classical Arabic and Modern Standard Arabic	Safaitic	Dadanitic, Taymanitic, Hismaic, etc.

However, several scholars, such as Giovanni Garbini, consider that the historical–genetic interpretation is not a satisfactory way of representing the development of the Semitic languages (contrary to Indo-European languages, which spread over a wide area and were usually isolated from each other). Edward Ullendorff even thinks it is impossible to establish any genetic hierarchy between Semitic languages. These scholars prefer a purely typological–geographical approach without any claim to a historical derivation.

For instance, in Garbini's view, the Syrian Desert was the core area of the Semitic languages where innovations came from. This region had contacts between sedentary settlements—on the desert fringe—and nomads from the desert. Some nomads joined settlements, while some settlers became isolated nomads ("Bedouinisation"). According to Garbini, this constant alternation explains how innovations spread from Syria into other areas. Isolated nomads progressively spread southwards and reached South Arabia, where the South Arabian language was spoken. They established linguistic contacts back and forth between Syria and South Arabia and their languages. That is why Garbini considers that Arabic does not belong exclusively to either the Northwest Semitic languages (Aramaic, Phoenician, Hebrew, etc.) or the South Semitic languages (Modern South Arabian, Geʽez, etc.) but that it was affected by innovations in both groups.

There is still no consensus regarding the exact position of Arabic within Semitic languages. The only consensus among scholars is that the various Arabic dialects spoken today exhibit common features with both South (South Arabian, Ethiopic) and the North (Canaanite, Aramaic) Semitic languages, and that it also contains unique innovations.

There is no consensus among scholars whether Arabic diglossia (between Classical Arabic and Arabic vernaculars) was the result of the Islamic conquests and due to the influence of non-Arabic languages or whether it was already the natural state in 7th-century Arabia (which means that both types coexisted in the pre-Islamic period).

== Modern spoken Arabic varieties ==
Dutch linguist Kees Versteegh has classified modern Arabic varieties as follows: (Note: Versteegh does not mention Shihhi Arabic, Dhofari Arabic, Judeo-Yemeni Arabic, Judeo-Moroccan Arabic, and Judeo-Tripolitanian Arabic.) (Note: Some scholars consider Algerian Arabic, Moroccan Arabic, and Tunisian Arabic to be koines.)

- Arabic
  - Syro-Palestinian (Levantine)
    - Western
      - Damascus Arabic
      - Cilician
      - All Lebanese dialects. Versteegh notes that Cypriot Arabic is usually included in this group although it also has North Mesopotamian features.
    - Northern: includes Aleppo Arabic
    - Southern
      - Urban Palestinian
      - Central Palestinian
      - South Palestinian and Jordanian, including the Hauran
  - Peninsular
    - Western (Hijazi): various Bedouin dialects in Hejaz and Tihamah
    - Northeastern (Najdi)
      - Anazi: Kuwaiti, Sunni Bahraini, and Gulf Arabic
      - Shammari: various Bedouin dialects in southern Iraq
      - Syro-Mesopotamian Bedouin: various Bedouin dialects of south Syria and Jordan
    - Northwestern: various dialects spoken in the Negev, Sinai, southern Jordan and some regions in north-western Saudi Arabia
    - Southern
      - Yemeni: Sanaani, Hadhrami and Ta'izzi-Adeni
      - Shiite Bahraini
      - Omani
  - Mesopotamian
    - Northern (Qeltu)
      - Tigris
        - Jewish Baghdadi and Christian Baghdadi
      - Euphrates
      - Anatolian
      - Jugari (nearly extinct)
    - Southern (Gilit)
      - Muslim Baghdadi
      - Khuzestani
  - Egypto-Sudanese
    - Chadian
      - Bagirmi: Nigeria, Cameroon, and part of Chad
      - Urban Chadian: including N’Djamena and Abbéché
    - Sudanese
      - Juba
      - Nubi
    - Egyptian
      - Cairene
      - Nile Delta: various eastern (Sharqia) and western varieties
      - Middle Egypt: Giza to Asyut
      - Sa'idi
        - Between Asyut and Nag Hammadi
        - Between Nag Hammadi and Qena
        - Between Qena and Luxor
        - Between Luxor and Esna
  - Maghrebi
    - Pre-Hilalian
      - Eastern: Libya, Tunisia (including Judeo-Tunisian), eastern Algeria
      - Western: western Algeria and Morocco
      - Maltese
      - Andalusian (extinct)
    - Hilalian: Bedouin dialects of North Africa
      - Sulaym: Libyan and southern Tunisia
      - Eastern: central Tunisia and eastern Algeria
      - Algerian (Saharan)
      - Western: Chaoui confederations in Casablanca-Settat
      - Hassaniya

== See also ==
- Arab (disambiguation)
- Etymology of Arab
- Varieties of Arabic

== Sources ==
- Brustad, Kristen; Zuniga, Emilie (6 March 2019). "Chapter 16: Levantine Arabic". In Huehnergard, John; Pat-El, Na'ama (eds.). The Semitic languages (2nd ed.). London & New York: Routledge Taylor & Francis Group. pp. 403–432. doi:10.4324/9780429025563. ISBN 978-0-429-02556-3. S2CID 166512720.
- Cantineau, Jean (1955). "La dialectologie arabe", Orbis 4:149–169.
- Fischer, Wolfdietrich; Jastrow, Otto (1980). Handbuch der arabischen Dialekte (in German). Wiesbaden: Harrassowitz. ISBN 3-447-02039-3. OCLC 7308117.
- Greenfield, Jonas C.; Winnett, F. V.; Reed, W. L. (1970). "Ancient Records from North Arabia". Journal of Biblical Literature. 89 (4): 483. doi:10.2307/3263463. ISSN 0021-9231. JSTOR 3263463.
- Kaye, Alan S., & Judith Rosenhouse (1997). "Arabic Dialects and Maltese", The Semitic Languages. Ed. Robert Hetzron. New York: Routledge. Pages 263–311.
- Hélène., Lozachmeur (1995). Présence Arabe dans le Croissant Fertile avant l'Hégire : actes de la table ronde internationale; le 13 novembre 1993. Éd. Recherche sur les Civilisations. ISBN 2-86538-254-0. OCLC 313039144.
- MACDONALD, M. C. A. (2000). "Reflections on the linguistic map of pre-Islamic Arabia". Arabian Archaeology and Epigraphy. 11 (1): 28–79. doi:10.1111/j.1600-0471.2000.aae110106.x. ISSN 0905-7196.
- Scagliarini, F., (1999). "The Dedanitic inscriptions from Jabal 'Ikma in north-western Hejaz" Proceedings of the Seminar for Arabian Studies 29, 143–150 ISBN 2-503-50829-4
- Sobelman, Harvey; Ferguson, Charles A.; Harrell, Richard S. (1962). Arabic dialect studies : a selected bibliography. Washington, D.C.: MLA. OCLC 63382915.
- Versteegh, C. H. M. (2014). The Arabic Language. Edinburgh University Press. ISBN 978-0-7486-4528-2. OCLC 872980196.
