= Levantine Arabic phonology =

Phonology of Levantine Arabic

This article is about the phonology of Levantine Arabic also known as Shāmi Arabic, and its sub-dialects.

== Phonology ==
Consonant phonemes of Urban Levantine Arabic (Beirut, Damascus, Jerusalem)
		Labial	Denti-alveolar		Palatal	Velar	Pharyngeal	Glottal
		Labial	plain	emphatic	Palatal	Velar	Pharyngeal	Glottal
Nasal		m – م	n – ن					
Occlusive	voiceless		t – ت	tˤ – ط		k – ك		ʔ – ء ق
Occlusive	voiced	b – ب	d – د	dˤ – ض				
Fricative	voiceless	f – ف	s – س ث	sˤ – ص	ʃ – ش	x – خ	ħ – ح	h – ه
Fricative	voiced		z – ز ذ	zˤ – ظ	ʒ – ج	ɣ – غ	ʕ – ع	
Trill / Tap			r – ر					
Approximant			l – ل	(ɫ)	j – ي	w – و		

Consonant phonemes of Levantine Arabic (Amman)
		Labial	Dental	Denti-alveolar		Palatal	Velar	Pharyngeal	Glottal
		Labial	Dental	plain	emphatic	Palatal	Velar	Pharyngeal	Glottal
Nasal		m – م		n – ن					
Occlusive	voiceless			t – ت	tˤ – ط		k – ك		ʔ – ء
Occlusive	voiced	b – ب		d – د	dˤ – ض	d͡ʒ – ج	g – ق		
Fricative	voiceless	f – ف	(θ – ث)	s – س	sˤ – ص	ʃ – ش	x – خ	ħ – ح	h – ه
Fricative	voiced		(ð – ذ)	z – ز	(ðˤ – ض ظ)		ɣ – غ	ʕ – ع	
Trill / Tap				r – ر					
Approximant				l – ل	(ɫ)	j – ي	w – و		

Notes: the usage of the dentals /θ/, /ð/, /ðˤ/ and /ʔ/ (instead of /g/) for ⟨ق⟩ in Jordanian Arabic depends on the speaker.

=== Consonants ===
The table below shows the correspondence between Modern Standard Arabic (MSA) phonemes, and their counterpart realization in Levantine Arabic. The Urban speech is taken as reference, the variations are given relative to it.

MSA phoneme	Common realisation	Variants
/b/	[b]	
/t/	[t]	
/θ/	[t]	[s] in some roots, [θ] in rural and outer Southern Levantine
/d͡ʒ/	[ʒ]	[d͡ʒ] in Northeastern Levantine and rural Palestinian
/ħ/	[ħ]	
/d/	[d]	
/ð/	[d]	[z] in some roots, [ð] in rural Southern Levantine
/r/	[r]	
/z/	[z]	
/s/	[s]	
/ʃ/	[ʃ]	
/sˤ/	[sˤ]	
/dˤ/	[dˤ]	
/tˤ/	[tˤ]	
/ðˤ/	[zˤ]	[dˤ] in some words, [ðˤ] in rural Southern Levantine
/ʕ/	[ʕ]	
/ɣ/	[ɣ]	
/f/	[f]	
/q/	[ʔ]	[q] in the Druze, rural Lebanese, coastal Syria and Idlib, [k] in rural Palestinian (only in presence of front vowels in southern and central Palestinian areas), [ɡ] in rural Hebron and Gaza Strip and outer Southern Levantine
/k/	[k]	[tʃ] in rural Palestinian (except southern and central Palestinian areas and only in presence of front vowels in south Palestinian areas)
/l/	[l]	
/m/	[m]	
/n/	[n]	
/h/	[h]	
/w/	[w]	
/j/	[j]	

NB. Hamza has a special treatment: at the end of a closed syllable, it vanishes and lengthens the preceding vowel, e.g. /raʔs/ > [raːs] (see compensatory lengthening). If followed by /i/, it is realized as [j], /naːʔim/ > [naːjem]. These evolutions plead for a Hijazi origin of Levantine Arabic. Word initially, hamza is often realized as [h] in Southern Levantine.

=== Vowels and diphthongs ===
The table below shows the correspondence between Modern Standard Arabic (MSA) phonemes and their counterpart realization in Levantine Arabic.

Phoneme	Southern	Lebanese	Central	Northern
/a/	[ɑ] or [ʌ]	[æ]	[ɑ] or [ʌ]	[ɔ] or [ɛ]
/i/	[e]	[ə] (stressed), [ɪ] (unstressed)	[ə] (stressed), [ɪ] (unstressed)	[e]
/u/	[o] or [ʊ]	[ə] (stressed), [ʊ] (unstressed)	[ə] (stressed), [o] (unstressed)	[o]
-aʰ	[ɑ] after back consonants, [e] after front consonants	[ʌ] after back consonants, [e] after front consonants	[ʌ] after back consonants, [e] after front consonants	[ʌ] after back consonants, [e] after front consonants
/aː/	[aː], final [a]	[ɔː] (back context), [ɛː] (front context), final [eː]	[ɑː] (back context), [æː] (front context), final [e]	[oː] (back context), [eː] (front context), final [e]
/iː/	[iː], final [i]	[iː], final [e]	[iː], final [i]	[iː], final [i]
/uː/	[uː], final [u]	[uː], final [o]	[uː], final [u]	[uː], final [u]
/aj/	[eː]	[eɪ]	[eː]	[eː]
/aw/	[oː]	[oʊ]	[oː]	[oː]

Levantine Arabic vowels can be represented in the Arabic script in many ways because of etymological and grammatical reasons, e.g. /əljoːm/ اليَوم ('today').

In French borrowings, nasal vowels /ã/, /õ/, /ɛ̃/ and /ũ/ occur: ʾasãsēr ("lift"), selülēr "mobile phone".

== Varieties ==
As in most Arabic-speaking areas, the spoken language differs significantly between urban, rural and nomad populations.

- In the Levant, nomads trace to various tribes of the Arabian Peninsula, and their dialect is consequently close to Peninsular Arabic (Najdi). Note that although claiming a Bedouin ancestry sounds prestigiousin the Levant, the Bedouin influence on this old sedentary area should not be overestimated. These dialects are not covered in detail here, as they are not specific to the area.
- The rural language is the one that changes most, and as in every old sedentary area, the changes are gradual, with more marked forms in extremal or isolated areas (e.g. general shift of /k/ to [tʃ] in rural Palestinian, or conservation of the diphthongs /aj/ and /aw/ in the Lebanese mountains).
- The urban language spoken in the major cities is remarkably homogeneous, with a few shibboleths (markers) only to distinguish the various cities (see below). Levantine Arabic is commonly understood to be this urban sub-variety. Teaching manuals for foreigners provide a systematic introduction to this sub-variety, as it would sound very strange for a foreigner to speak a marked rural dialect, immediately raising questions on unexpected family links, for instance.

=== Urban Levantine Arabic ===
As mentioned above, the urban varieties are remarkably homogeneous throughout the whole area, compared to the changes the language undergoes in rural dialects. This homogeneity is probably inherited from the trading network among cities in the Ottoman Empire. It may also represent an older state of affairs. As a matter of facts, there is a current trend to diverge from this unity, the language of the cities taking on some of the features of their neighboring villages (e.g. Jerusalem used to say as Damascus [ˈnɪħna] ('we') and [ˈhʊnne] ('they') at the beginning of the 20th century, and this has moved to the more rural [ˈɪħna] and [ˈhʊmme] nowadays.). The table below shows the main historical variants which have shibboleth role, most of the rest of the language remaining the same.

City	ق q	ج j	we (subj.)	you (pl, compl.)	they (subj)	they (compl.)	I say	he says	I write	he writes	write!	now	it is not …
Aleppo	[ʔ]	[dʒ]	[ˈnəħne]	[-kon]	[ˈhənnen]	[-on]	[baˈʔuːl]	[bɪˈʔuːl]	[ˈbaktob]	[ˈbjəktob]	[ktoːb]	[ˈhallaʔ]	[mʊ]
Damascus	[ʔ]	[ʒ]	[ˈnəħna]	[-kʊn]	[ˈhənnen]	[-hʊn]	[bʔuːl]	[bəˈʔuːl]	[ˈbəkteb]	[ˈbjəkteb]	[ktoːb]	[ˈhallaʔ]	[mʊ]
Beirut	[ʔ]	[ʒ]	[ˈnəħna]	[-kʊn]	[ˈhənne]	[-ʊn]	[bʔuːl]	[bɪˈʔuːl]	[ˈbəktʊb]	[ˈbjəktʊb]	[ktoːb]	[ˈhallaʔ]	[məʃ]
Haifa	[ʔ]	[ʒ]	[ˈɪħna]	[-kʊ]	[ˈhɪnne]	[-hen]	[baˈʔuːl]	[bɪˈʔuːl]	[ˈbaktɪb]	[ˈbɪktɪb]	[ˈɪktɪb]	[ˈɪssa]	[mɪʃ]
Jerusalem	[ʔ]	[ʒ]	[ˈɪħna]	[-kʊm]	[ˈhʊmme]	[-hʊm]	[baˈʔuːl]	[bɪˈʔuːl]	[ˈbaktʊb]	[ˈbɪktʊb]	[ˈʊktʊb]	[ha-l-ˈʔeːt] [halˈlaʔ]	[mʊʃ]
Hebron	[ʔ]	[dʒ]	[ˈɪħna]	[-kʊ]	[ˈhʊmme]	[-hom]	[baˈʔuːl]	[bɪˈʔuːl]	[ˈbaktob]	[ˈbɪktob]	[ˈʊktob]	[haʔˈʔeːteː]	[mʊʃ]
Gaza	[g]	[ʒ]	[ˈɪħna]	[-kʊ]	[ˈhʊmma]	[-hʊm]	[baˈguːl]	[bɪˈguːl]	[ˈbaktʊb]	[ˈbɪktʊb]	[ˈʊktʊb]	[ˈhalˈgeːt]	[mɪʃ]
Amman	[ʔ], [ɡ]	[dʒ]	[ˈɪħna]	[-kʊm]	[ˈhʊmme]	[-hʊm]	[baˈɡuːl]	[bɪˈɡuːl]	[ˈbaktʊb]	[ˈbɪktʊb]	[ˈʊktʊb]	[hasˈsaːʕ]	[mʊʃ]
al-Karak	[ɡ]	[dʒ]	[ˈɪħna]	[-kʊm]	[ˈhʊmmʊ]	[-hʊm]	[baˈɡuːl]	[bɪˈɡuːl]	[ˈbaktʊb]	[ˈbɪktʊb]	[ˈʊktʊb]	[hasˈsaːʕ]	[mʊ(ʃ)]
Irbid	[ʔ], [ɡ]	[dʒ]	[ˈɪħna]	[-kʊm]	[ˈhʊmme]	[-hʊm]	[baˈɡuːl]	[bɪˈɡuːl]	[ˈbaktʊb]	[ˈbɪktʊb]	[ˈʊktʊb]	[hasˈsaːʕ]	[mʊʃ]

=== Rural subdialects ===
Rural Levantine Arabic can be divided into two groups of mutually intelligible subdialects. Again, these dialect considerations have to be understood to apply mainly to rural populations, as the urban forms change much less.

- Northern Levantine Arabic, spoken in Lebanon, Syria (except the Hauran area south of Damascus) and Northern Israel. It is characterized by:

- a widespread pronunciation of /q/ as [ʔ] (the Druze, however, retain the uvular [q]).
- A strong tendency to pronounce long /aː/ as [eː] (imala) in a front phonemic context or [oː] (tafkhim) in a back phonemic context. This tendency is stronger as one goes northward. For instance, Damascus and Beirut only have final /aː/ consistently pronounced as [e], e.g. /ʃitaː/ ('rain') is pronounced [ʃəte] . This feature may be used to distinguish Central from Northern Levantine.
- A widespread realization of /dʒ/ as [ʒ], especially along the Mediterranean coast. This feature may be used to distinguish northwest (coastal, Nusayriyyah) from northeast (e.g. Aleppo, Idlib) Levantine Arabic where /dʒ/ is realized as [dʒ].
- The second and third person plural pronominal suffixes end in /-n/ : /-kun/, /-hun/ (or /-hen/ in Galilee).
- The characteristic vowel of the imperative is long: /ˈuktub/ > [ktoːb].
- The first and third person singular imperfect are /bquːl/ ('I say') and /bəquːl/ ('he says') in Lebanon and Damascus instead of /baquːl/ and /biquːl/, respectively, everywhere else, which may be used to further distinguish Central from Northern and Southern Levantine Arabic.

- South Levantine Arabic, spoken in Palestine between Nazareth and Bethlehem, in the Syrian Hauran mountains, and in western Jordan and Israel.

- Tafkhim is nonexistent there, and imala affects only the feminine ending /-ah/ > [e] after front consonants (and not even in Gaza where it remains /a/), while /ʃitaː/ is [ʃɪta].
- In central Palestinian (Jaffa, West Bank, Nazareth, Tiberias) rural speech, /k/ changes to [tʃ], /q/ changes to [k], interdentals are conserved, and /dʒ/ is pronounced [dʒ]. In southern Palestinian (Ashdod, Asqelon, Hebron countryside) as well as western Jordan and Syrian Hauran, /q/ changes to [ɡ] and /k/ changes to [tʃ] before front vowels. This latter feature resembles the North Arabian Bedouin dialects.

In most of Israel, apart from Galilee and the Naqab, rural dialects are believed to be almost extinct, and this description given is the pre-1948 state of affairs. Palestinian refugees in Jordan have brought with them their typical features, although they tend to adopt the emerging Jordanian urban speech.

To these typical, widespread subdialects, one could add marginal varieties such as:

- Outer South Levantine, spoken in the Gaza–Beersheba area, as well as in cities east of the Dead Sea in Jordan (Karak, Tafilah), which display different Bedouin influences as compared to south Levantine. For instance, there, /k/ never changes to [tʃ]. This reflects Hijazi or Sinai Bedouin Arabic pronunciation rather than that of North Arabian Bedouin dialects.
- Bedouin dialects proper, which on top of the above-mentioned features that influence the sedentary dialects, present typical stress patterns (e.g. gahawa syndrome) or lexical items.
