= North Arabian =

North Arabian may refer to:

- the northern Arabian Peninsula
- Ancient North Arabian languages
- the Adnanites, a group of Arab tribes
- the North Arabian languages
