= Languages of Syria =

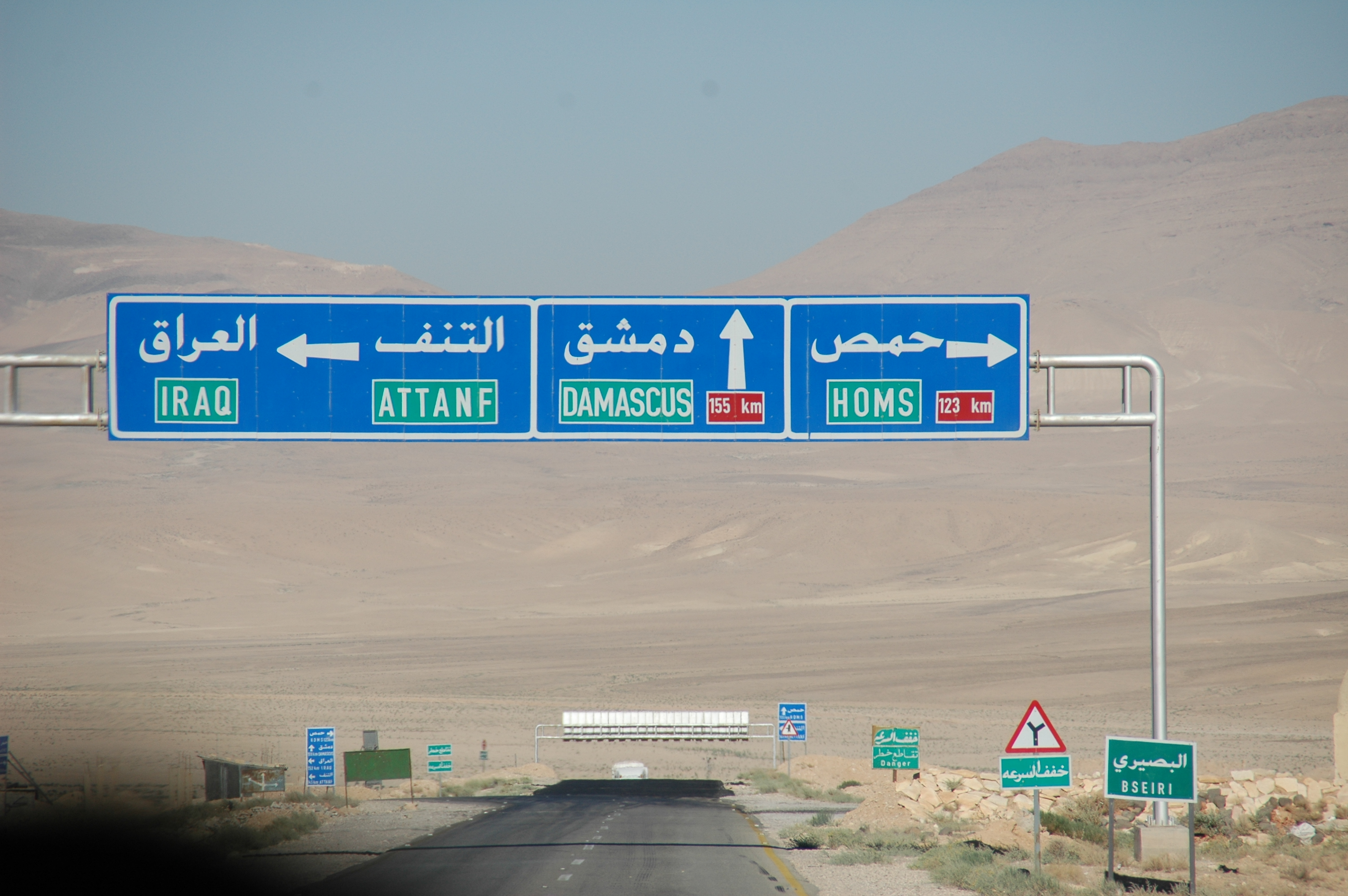
- Road sign in Syria in Arabic and English
- Official: Modern Standard Arabic
- National: Modern Standard Arabic, Kurdish
- Vernacular: Levantine Arabic and Mesopotamian Arabic
- Minority: Najdi Arabic, Kurdish, Turkish, Neo-Aramaic and Classical Syriac, Circassian, Chechen, Armenian, Greek, Domari
- Foreign: English and French
- Signed: Syrian Sign Language
- Keyboard layout: Arabic keyboard

Arabic is the official language of Syria and is the most widely spoken language in the country. Several Arabic dialects are used in everyday life, most notably Levantine in the west and Mesopotamian in the northeast. Kurdish is a recognized national language. According to The Encyclopedia of Arabic Language and Linguistics, in addition to Arabic and Kurdish, the following languages are spoken in the country, in order of the number of speakers: Turkish, Neo-Aramaic, Circassian, Chechen, Armenian, and Greek, none of which are official.

Historically, Aramaic was the lingua franca of the region before the advent of Arabic and is still spoken among Assyrians, and Classical Syriac is still used as the liturgical language of various Syriac Christian denominations. Most remarkably, Western Neo-Aramaic is still spoken in the village of Maaloula as well as two neighboring villages, 56 kilometres (35 mi) northeast of Damascus.

Syrian Sign Language is the principal language of the deaf community.

== Arabic ==
A man speaking Syrian Arabic.

Modern Standard Arabic (MSA) is the language of education and most writing, but it is not usually spoken. Instead, various dialects of Levantine Arabic, which are not mutually intelligible with MSA, are spoken by most Syrians, with Damascus Arabic being the prestigious dialect in the media. Dialects of the cities of Damascus, Homs, Hama and Tartous are more similar to each other than to that of the northern region of Aleppo. Allied dialects are spoken in the coastal mountains. Levantine Arabic has the ISO 639-3 language code apc. Levantine has no standardized spelling, and is written in two main ways: using Arabic script from right to left and, less commonly, using Arabizi from left to right.

Lebanese is similar especially to the southern Syrian dialects, though it has more influence from Palestinian Arabic.

Due to Syria's long history of multiculturalism and foreign imperialism, Syrian Arabic exhibits a vocabulary stratum that includes word borrowings from Turkish, Kurdish, Armenian, Syriac, English, French, Hebrew and Persian.

Other forms of Arabic natively spoken in Syria include:

- the dialect spoken in the Jabal al-Druze (Jabal al-Arab) mountains;
- the eastern dialect group (Al-Hasakah, Al-Raqqah, and Deir ez-Zor), part of Mesopotamian Arabic (rarely called "North Syrian Arabic");
- Shawi Arabic, spoken by sheep-rearing Bedouin;
- Najdi Arabic, spoken by the Rwala tribe.

Non-indigenous dialects of Arabic, most notably those of Iraq and Palestine, are frequently used within their respective refugee diasporas, especially in Damascus.

== Kurdish ==
Kurdish (specifically Kurmanji) is the second most spoken language in Syria. It is spoken particularly in the northeast and northwest of the country by the Kurdish minority. It is a recognized national language.

== Turkish ==
Turkish is the third most widely used language in Syria. Various Turkish dialects are spoken by the Turkmen/Turkoman minority, mostly in villages east of the Euphrates and along the Syrian-Turkish border. In addition, there are Turkish language islands in the Qalamun area and the Homs area.

Moreover, Syrian Arabic dialects have borrowed many loanwords from Turkish, particularly during Ottoman rule.

== Neo-Aramaic ==
Four dialects of Neo-Aramaic are spoken in Syria. Western Neo-Aramaic is traditionally spoken in only three villages, Maaloula and Jubb'adin, and Bakhʽa, in the Anti-Lebanon Mountains of western Syria. Most of the population of Bakhʽa fled to other parts of Syria or to Lebanon during the Syrian civil war. Turoyo speakers from Tur Abdin have settled in the province of Al-Hasakah. There is also a relatively large linguistic island formed by the Assyrians along the Khabur River. Moreover, Chaldean Neo-Aramaic speakers are found in the northeast of Syria.

== Circassian ==
Circassian languages are spoken in some villages south of Aleppo, as well as in the Homs area and on the Golan Heights. In particular, Kabardian is spoken by the Circassian minority.

== Chechen ==
The Chechen language is spoken by the Chechen minority in two villages on the Khabur River.

== Armenian ==
The Armenian language is spoken within the Armenian community in Aleppo and other major cities, such as Damascus and in one small town exclusively in Kessab. Although Syria does not recognise any minority languages, the Armenians are the only community allowed to teach in their own language, in addition to Arabic.

== Greek ==
There is also a small number of Greek speakers in Syria. The Greek language is spoken in Al-Hamidiyah by Cretan Muslims. Their demand to be allowed to teach Greek in their schools has been rejected by the State with the argument that they are Muslims.

== Foreign languages ==
English and French are also spoken by a limited number of Syrian citizens, mostly in urban centers and among the well educated.
