= Alphonse Chérel =

French polyglot, entrepreneur and author (1882–1956)

Alphonse Chérel (3 June 1882 – 7 September 1956) was a French polyglot, author and entrepreneur. He founded Assimil, a French language-learning enterprise, in 1929, as well as la méthode Assimil (the Assimil method) of learning foreign languages.

== Biography ==
Alphonse Chérel was born in Rennes, France, in 1882. His father was a miller, and Alphonse Chérel grew up in Romazy, where his father's mill was located. He started learning English at a school in Rennes.

He read many travel books, such as Le Tour de la France par Deux Enfants, which inspired him to travel to foreign countries. Since 1902, was a private tutor for about 3–4 years in London, England, and later in Berlin, Germany. In 1909, he joined his brother in Moscow, Russia, where the former worked as a tutor until 1914.

He moved back to France in the spring of 1914, shortly before the emergence of the First World War. Because of his mastery of the English, Russian and German languages, he became an interpreter, thus avoiding being put on the frontlines. During this period, he translated intercepted messages of the German forces. He participated in the Dardanelles Campaign, where he acted as an interpreter between the British and French generals. He was likewise wounded during the same campaign. While he was wounded, Chérel was reported to have entered a delirium where he spoke only German for a few days, which made some assume he was guilty of espionage, though he was later found to be innocent.

After the end of the First World War, he traveled to Spain and Italy, and again to Germany, finally settling in Paris in 1927.

He founded Assimil in 1929, and published his first book, L'Anglais sans peine (English without toil), in the same year. After the founding of the company, he worked together with his brother. In 1933, Alphonse Chérel had the idea of using discs (which at that time had only recently appeared) to allow learners to listen to the voices of native speakers and naturally acquire the pronunciation of their target language.

In the early stages of the company, Alphonse Chérel made bicycle deliveries to his clients, until he got into an accident where he injured his leg. He was then amputated below his hip, which made him unable to do deliveries; he thus dedicated his time to working on other language learning books (e.g. for Spanish, German, Russian and Italian).

When he was 57 years old, he met an opera-singer, and married her in 1940. The couple later had two sons: Jean-Loup Chérel (born 1942) and Gil Chérel (born 1944).

Chérel died in 1956 of a cerebral hemorrhage. Eventually, the leadership of Assimil was taken over by Jean-Loup Chérel from 1968 to 2007, after which it ultimately passed to Yannick Chérel, the grandson of Alphonse.

== Methodology ==
For Chérel, a naturalist approach to language learning was more important than that of pedantic grammarians that prioritized rote memorization of grammar rules. For that reason, his Assimil method utilized and emphasized daily exposure and assimilation (hence the name), as well as including humorous drawings (which were at first done by Pierre Soymier, who provisioned the sketches for the company until the 1970s).
