= North Levantine Arabic =

Dialect of Levantine Arabic

North Levantine Arabic (Arabic: اللهجة الشامية الشمالية, romanized: al-lahja š-šāmiyya š-šamāliyya, North Levantine: el-lahje š-šāmiyye š-šmāliyye) was defined in the ISO 639-3 international standard for language codes as a distinct Arabic variety, under the apc code. It was also known as Syro-Lebanese Arabic, though that term was also used to refer to all Levantine Arabic varieties.

It was reported by Ethnologue as stemming from the north of the Levant in Turkey (specifically the coastal regions of the Adana, Hatay, and Mersin provinces) to Lebanon, passing through the Mediterranean coastal regions of Syria (the Latakia and Tartus governorates) as well as the areas surrounding Aleppo and Damascus.

In 2023, South Levantine Arabic and North Levantine Arabic were merged into a single Levantine Arabic in the ISO, based on the high mutual intelligibility between Arabic varieties spoken by sedentary populations across the Levant and the lack of clear distinctions between variants along national borders.

== Dialects ==
- Syrian Arabic: Damascene and Aleppo dialects are well-known.
- Lebanese Arabic: North Lebanese, South Lebanese (Metuali, Shii), North-Central Lebanese (Mount Lebanon Arabic), South-Central Lebanese (Druze Arabic), Standard Lebanese, Beqaa, Sunni Beiruti, Saida Sunni, Iqlim-Al-Kharrub Sunni, Jdaideh
- Cilicia, Turkey: Cilician Arabic
