= Aleppo Arabic =

Arabic variety spoken in Aleppo, Syria

- Aleppine Arabic
- Arabic: اللهجة الحلبية
- Native to: Syria
- Language family: Afro-Asiatic: Semitic; West Semitic; Central Semitic; Arabian; Arabic; Levantine-Cypriot Arabic; Levantine Arabic; Aleppo Arabic
- Writing system: Arabic alphabet Arabic chat alphabet

Language codes
- ISO 639-3: (covered by apc)
- Glottolog: alep1241
- North Levantine

Aleppo Arabic or Aleppine Arabic is the urban Arabic variety spoken in the city of Aleppo.

== Phonology ==
Aleppo Arabic is characterised by the usage of /d͡ʒ/ instead of the typical urban /ʒ/ used in Damascus Arabic and in Lebanese Arabic. It agrees with Lebanese Arabic with its usage of medial imāla which often turns /aː/ into /eː/. Also has /t͡ʃ/, which is not typical of urban Levantine dialects.

=== Consonants ===
		Labial	Dental/Alveolar		Palatal	Velar	Pharyngeal	Glottal
		Labial	plain	emph.	Palatal	Velar	Pharyngeal	Glottal
Nasal		m	n					
Stop/ Affricate	voiceless	(p)	t	tˤ	t͡ʃ	k		ʔ
Stop/ Affricate	voiced	b	d	dˤ	d͡ʒ	(ɡ)		
Fricative	voiceless	f	s	sˤ	ʃ	x	ħ	h
Fricative	voiced	(v)	z	zˤ		ɣ	ʕ	
Trill			r					
Approximant			l		j	w		

- Other sounds /p, v, ɡ/ appear in loanwords.
- /t, tˤ/, /d, dˤ/ are phonetically dental [t̪, t̪ˤ], [d̪, d̪ˤ].
- /k/ may also be articulated as post-palatal [c̠], as can /ɡ/ as [ɟ̠] from loanwords.
- Although the dialect pronounces the Standard Arabic reflex */q/ as a glottal stop /ʔ/, a uvular [q] may also be heard in loanwords from Standard Arabic. It may also commonly be pronounced as an emphatic glottal stop [ʔˤ].

=== Vowels ===
	Front	Central	Back
Close	i iː		u uː
Mid	e eː	ə	o oː
Open	a aː		

- /a, aː/ is typically heard as [æ, æː] when in palatal consonant environments or when preceding most non emphatic consonants. It is heard as [ɒ, ɒː] when in emphatic environments.

== Media ==
Syrian historian Khayr al-Din al-Asadi's 1971 Comparative Encyclopedia of Aleppo (Arabic: موسوعة حلب المقارنة) contained 50,000 definitions of words found in Aleppine Arabic.
