= South Levantine Arabic =

Subdivision of Levantine Arabic

South Levantine Arabic (Arabic: اللهجة الشامية الجنوبية, romanized: al-lahja š-šāmiyya l-janūbiyya, South Levantine: il-lahje š-šāmiyye l-jnūbiyye) was defined in the ISO 639-3 international standard for language codes as a distinct Arabic variety, under the ajp code. It was reported by Ethnologue as being spoken in the Southern Levant: Palestine (the West Bank, including East Jerusalem, and the Gaza Strip), Israel, and most of Jordan (in the Ajlun, Al Balqa, Al Karak, Al Mafraq, Amman, Irbid, Jarash, and Madaba governorates).

In 2023, South Levantine Arabic and North Levantine Arabic were merged into a single Levantine Arabic in the ISO, based on the high mutual intelligibility between Arabic varieties spoken by sedentary populations across the Levant and the lack of clear distinctions between variants along national borders.
