= Cilician Arabic =

Variety of Levantine Arabic spoken in Turkey

- Native to: Turkey
- Language family: Afro-Asiatic: Semitic; West; Central; Arabic; Levantine; Cilician Arabic
- Writing system: Arabic alphabet

Language codes
- ISO 639-3: (covered by apc)
- Glottolog: cili1234
- IETF: apc-TR

Cilician Arabic, Cilicia-Antioch Arabic, Çukurova Arabic, or Çukurovan is a Levantine dialect spoken in Turkey in the geo-cultural area of Cilicia, the coastal region of the Turkish Eastern Mediterranean from Hatay to Mersin and Adana.

== Speakers ==
Turkish politician Tülay Hatimoğulları giving a speech in Cilician Arabic

Cilician Arabic speakers in Turkey come from four different religious groups: Sunni Muslims, Alawites, Christians (including Greek Orthodox and Catholics), and Jews. It is difficult to know the precise number of speakers. Due to pressures against minority languages, younger generations of the Arabic-speaking communities increasingly use Turkish as their mother tongue. In 1971, 36% of the population in Hatay was Arabic-speaking. In 1996, Grimes estimated 500,000 speakers of North Levantine Arabic in Turkey.

In 2011, according to Procházka there were 70,000 Çukurova Arabic speakers in the Adana and Mersin provinces and people under 30 years old had completely switched to Turkish. In 2011, Werner estimated 200,000 Antiochia Arabic speakers in Hatay. According to Ethnologue, the language is "threatened" in Turkey. Çukurova Arabic is in danger of becoming extinct in a few decades.
