= Assimil =

Publisher of foreign language courses

ASSiMiL
- Founded: 1929
- Founder: Alphonse Chérel
- Country of origin: France
- Headquarters location: Paris
- Publication types: Books
- Nonfiction topics: Foreign language courses
- Official website: assimil.com

Assimil (often stylised as ASSiMiL) is a French company, founded by Alphonse Chérel in 1929. It creates and publishes foreign language courses, which began with their first book Anglais sans peine (English Without Toil). Since then, the company has expanded into numerous other languages and continues to publish today.

Their method for teaching foreign languages is through listening to recordings, and the reading of a book with the text that you are listening to: one side native language, one side foreign language. This method is focused on learning whole sentences, for an organic learning of the grammar. It begins with a long passive phase of only reading and listening, and eventually adds active exercises. Most books contain around 100 lessons, with the active phase starting on Lesson 50. The name Assimil comes from assimilate 'to incorporate or absorb knowledge into the mind'.

The company publishes several different series:

- "Learn" series, which teach to an A2 level;
- "With Ease" series (originally "Without Toil"), which teach basic rules of grammar up to a CEFR B2 level and a vocabulary of 2000–3000 words;
- "Perfectionnement" ("Using") series, which teaches more advanced idiosyncrasies and idioms of the target language;
- Business series, which focuses on vocabulary related to international business;
- Idioms series, which teaches common idioms;
- Phrasebooks, which serve as a travel companion;
- Slang series, for contemporary slang usage;
- "Assimemor" ("My First Words") series, which is meant to introduce a language to young children

== Languages ==
=== English base ===
For the English reader, the following languages are available (as of October 2022):

Language	Learn (A2)	With Ease	Using (Advanced)	Phrasebook	For Kids
Arabic	No	Yes	No	No	No
Chinese (Mandarin)	No	Yes	No	Yes	No
Dutch	No	Yes	No	No	No
French	Yes	Yes	Yes	Yes	Yes
German	No	Yes	No	Yes	Yes
Hebrew	No	Yes	No	No	No
Hungarian	No	Yes	No	No	No
Italian	No	Yes	No	Yes	Yes
Japanese	No	Yes	No	Yes	No
Korean	No	Yes	No	Yes	No
Portuguese (Brazilian)	No	Yes	No	No	No
Russian	No	Yes	No	Yes	No
Spanish (Cuban)	No	No	No	Yes	No
Spanish (Spain)	Yes	Yes	No	Yes	Yes
Yiddish	No	Yes	No	No	No

== See also ==
- Language education
- List of Language Self-Study Programs
