= Kees Versteegh =

Dutch linguist (born 1947)

- Born: Cornelis Henricus Maria Versteegh; 1947 (age 78–79); Arnhem, Gelderland, The Netherlands

Academic background
- Education: University of Nijmegen

Cornelis Henricus Maria "Kees" Versteegh (Dutch pronunciation: [ˈkeːs fərˈsteːx]; (Note: In isolation, Versteegh is pronounced [vərˈsteːx].) born 1947) is a Dutch academic linguist. He served as a professor of Islamic studies and the Arabic language at Radboud University Nijmegen in The Netherlands until April 2011.

Versteegh graduated from Radboud University in 1977, the subject of his doctoral dissertation having been the influence of Greek on Arabic. He was a lecturer in the Department of Middle Eastern Studies until 1987, when he took a position at the Netherlands Institute in Cairo for two years. Versteegh returned to Radboud in 1989, and in 2011 he became professor emeritus. Versteegh's research and views on the Arabic language and its evolution have been described as groundbreaking.
