= Lexical similarity =

Similarity of languages' vocabulary (lexicon)

In linguistics, lexical similarity is a measure of the degree to which the word sets of two given languages are similar. A lexical similarity of 1 (or 100%) would mean a total overlap between vocabularies, whereas 0 means there are no common words.

There are different ways to define the lexical similarity and the results vary accordingly. For example, Ethnologue's method of calculation consists of comparing a regionally standardized wordlist (comparable to the Swadesh list) and counting those forms that show similarity in both form and meaning. Using such a method, English was evaluated to have a lexical similarity of 60% with German and 27% with French.

Lexical similarity can be used to evaluate the degree of genetic relationship between two languages. Percentages higher than 85% usually indicate that the two languages being compared are likely to be related dialects.

The lexical similarity is only one indication of the mutual intelligibility of the two languages, since the latter also depends on the degree of phonetical, morphological, and syntactical similarity. The variations due to differing wordlists weigh on this. For example, the lexical similarity between French and English is considerable in lexical fields relating to culture, whereas their similarity is smaller as far as basic (function) words are concerned. Unlike mutual intelligibility, lexical similarity can only be symmetrical.

== East Asian languages ==
In the case of Korean, there are words borrowed from Chinese which are called Sino-Korean vocabulary, and there are new Korean words created from Chinese characters. There are also words borrowed from Sino-Japanese vocabulary. According to the Standard Korean Language Dictionary published by the National Institute of Korean Language (NIKL), Sino-Korean represents approximately 57% of the Korean vocabulary.

As for Japanese, it has been estimated that about 60% of the words contained in modern Japanese dictionaries are Sino-Japanese, and that about 18–20% of words used in common speech are Sino-Japanese, as measured by the National Institute for Japanese Language in its study of language use in NHK broadcasts from April to June 1989. The usage of such Sino-Japanese words also increase in formal or literary contexts, and in expressions of abstract or complex ideas.

Despite the borrowing of many Chinese words into the Japanese and Korean languages, speakers of the three languages do not have enough mutual intelligibility to be able to communicate with each other. Japanese and Korean are not tonal languages, but Chinese languages are tonal, which means that the proper pronunciation of a syllable for a word is important for communication, as well as the proper tone when pronouncing a word. When Chinese symbols (Hanzi) are used for writing in Korean (which are called "Hanja") and in Japanese (which are called "Kanji"), sometimes a few words can be understood in a sentence, but an entire sentence is highly unlikely to be understood even in writing. Japanese and Korean have their own writing systems which are different from Hanzi, so full sentences are unlikely to be fully written in borrowed Chinese symbols.

== Indo-European languages ==
The table below shows some lexical similarity values for pairs of selected Romance, Germanic, and Slavic languages, as collected and published by Ethnologue.

Lang. code	Language 1 ↓	Lexical similarity coefficients										
		Italian	Spanish	Portuguese	French	Romanian	Catalan	Romansh	Sardinian	English	German	Russian
ita	Italian	1	0.82	0.80	0.89	0.77	0.87	0.78	0.85	-	-	-
spa	Spanish	0.82	1	0.89	0.75	0.71	0.85	0.74	0.76	-	-	-
por	Portuguese	0.80	0.89	1	0.75	0.72	0.85	0.74	0.76	0.20	-	-
fra	French	0.89	0.75	0.75	1	0.75	-	0.78	0.80	0.27	0.29	-
ron	Romanian	0.77	0.71	0.72	0.75	1	0.73	0.72	0.74	0.25	-	-
cat	Catalan	0.87	0.85	0.85	-	0.73	1	0.76	0.75	-	-	-
roh	Romansh	0.78	0.74	0.74	0.78	0.72	0.76	1	0.74	-	-	-
srd	Sardinian	0.85	0.76	0.76	0.80	0.74	0.75	0.74	1	-	-	-
eng	English	-	-	0.20	0.27	0.25	-	-	-	1	0.60	0.24
deu	German	-	-	-	0.29	-	-	-	-	0.60	1	-
rus	Russian	-	-	-	-	-	-	-	-	0.24	-	1
		Italian	Spanish	Portuguese	French	Romanian	Catalan	Romansh	Sardinian	English	German	Russian
Language 2 →		ita	spa	por	fra	ron	cat	roh	srd	eng	deu	rus

Notes:

- Language codes are from standard ISO 639-3.
- Roberto Bolognesi and Wilbert Heeringa found the average divergence between Sardinian and Italian to be around 48.7%, ranging from a minimum dialectal degree of divergence being 46.6% to the highest one of 51.1%. That would make the various dialects of Sardinian slightly more divergent from Italian than Spanish (with an average degree of divergence from Italian being around 46.0%) is.
- "-" denotes that comparison data are not available.
- In the case of English-French lexical similarity, at least two other studies estimate the number of English words directly inherited from French at 28.3% and 41% respectively, with respectively 28.24% and 15% of other English words derived from Latin, putting English-French lexical similarity at around 0.56, with reciprocally lower English-German lexical similarities. Another study estimates the number of English words with an Italic origin at 51%, consistent with the two previous analyses.

== See also ==
- Lexis (linguistics)
- Language family
- Dialect
- Linguistic distance
