= Damascus Arabic =

Arabic dialect of Damascus

- Arabic: اللهجِة الشاميِّة
- Native to: Syria
- Native speakers: 1.6 million (2004)
- Language family: Afro-Asiatic: Semitic; West; Central; Arabic; Levantine; Damascus Arabic
- Writing system: Arabic alphabet Arabic chat alphabet

Language codes
- ISO 639-3: (covered by apc)
- IETF: apc-u-sd-sydi
- North Levantine

David speaking Syrian Arabic.

Damascus Arabic (llahže ššāmiyye), also called Damascus dialect or Damascene dialect is a Levantine Arabic spoken dialect, indigenous to and spoken primarily in Damascus. As the dialect of the capital city of Syria, and due to its use in the Syrian broadcast media, it is prestigious and widely recognized by speakers of other Syrian dialects, as well as in Lebanon, Palestine, and Jordan. Accordingly, in modern times, it is sometimes known as Syrian Arabic or the Syrian Dialect; however, the former term may also be used to refer to the group of similar urban sedentary dialects of the Levant, or to mean Levantine Arabic in general.

== History ==
=== Classification ===
DA, like other Levantine dialects, is influenced by Aramaic.

=== Studies ===
DA is one of the most represented and researched Arabic dialects; It has been researched or discussed by Grotzfeld, Ambros (1977), Cowell, Cantineau and Helbaoui (1953), Kuhnt (1958), Kassab (1970), Ferguson (1961), Bloch (1964) and (1965), Bergsträsser (1924), which also contains around fifty-pages worth of transcribed DA, and the twelve-volume course written by the US Defense Language Institute (1983).

Of its dictionaries which focus on the old varieties of DA, there are Strowasser's (English-DA Arabic), Ṭīb al-Kalām (Arabic-DA Arabic) and the long-awaited Salamé and Lentin's (French-DA Arabic). A dictionary of idioms has been released by Borhan Ahmad.

== Modern usage ==
=== Media ===
DA most influential position is in media, where it is the de facto official Syrian dialect/accent in the media when MSA is not used and is the most influential dialect in Arabic drama. It has been said that DA is taking the traditional place of Egyptian Arabic there. The most influential Syrian series that is used almost only in DA, Bab Al-Hara, acquired a staggering 50 million view per episode in its peaks and the success of some Turkish shows in the Arab world has been attributed to dubs in DA.

=== Literature ===
It is not common for DA to be written in literature, as MSA is usually used in this genre instead. It has however made its way to al-turath al-sha'bi in several pieces of literature, like Siham Turjuman's Yā māl al-Shām (only dialogues), Munīr Kayāl's Ḥikāyāt dimašqiyya (only dialogues) and Institut Francais du Proche-Orient's fifteen-volume Sirat Al-Malik Al-Zahir Baibars Hsab Al-Riwaya Al-Shamiyya (scattered).

== Phonology ==
=== Consonants ===
DA Consonants
		Labial		Dental	Alveolar		Palatal	Velar	Uvular	Pharyngeal	Glottal
		plain	emphatic	Dental	plain	emphatic	Palatal	Velar	Uvular	Pharyngeal	Glottal
Nasal		m	mˤ		n						
Stop	voiceless	(p)			t	tˤ	(tʃ)	k	(q)		ʔ
Stop	voiced	b	bˤ		d	dˤ	(dʒ)	(ɡ)			
Fricative	voiceless	f		(θ)	s	sˤ	ʃ	x		ħ	h
Fricative	voiced	(v)		(ð)	z	zˤ	ʒ	ɣ		ʕ	
Tap/trill					r						
Approximant					l	lˤ	j	w			

- The phonemes /p, v, g, q/ appear mainly in borrowings and loanwords. A rare /tʃ/ has been reported in Turkish loanwords but it is usually articulated as /ʃ/.
- /p/ is not generally replaceable by /b/, as in kɔmpyūtər 'computer'; although unaspirated [p] is a frequent allophone of /b/ before voiceless obstruents /f, k, x, ħ, q, s, ʃ, sˤ, t, tˤ/ and at the end of phrases.
- Uvular /q/ is frequent in borrowings from Classical Arabic and sometimes alternates freely with /ʔ/; but always using /q/ instead of the dialectal /ʔ/ (as used in some rural dialects) is not prestigious in DA, where it could be mocked.
- While they are used more in rural dialects than in the urban DA, voiceless /θ/ is an educated variant of /s/ and /t/ in words with /θ/ in MSA. Similarly, its voiced variant /ð/ is an educated variant of /z/ and /d/ in words with /ð/ in MSA. These two variants are mainly noticeable from educated men whose professions require the frequent usage of MSA in its written form and is considered a literary, educated and a religious usage.
- All of /m, b, l/ have emphatic (velarised) equivalents but a standard method of writing them in the Arabic script does not exist. e.g. Minimal pairs typically exist in Mayy for (a female name) while /mˤ/ in ṃayy for (water), /b/ in bab[h]a (her door) and two /bˤ/ in ḅaḅa (dad), two /l/ in 'all[h]a (he told her) and two /lˤ/ in aḷḷa[h] (Allah).
- [dʒ] is used in the Aleppo region, and in more rural parts of Greater Syria, instead of /ʒ/. [tʃ] only occurs in certain words of the Aleppo region, and in certain rural dialects elsewhere, in place of /k/ in certain positions.
- While Lentin argues that /r/ contrasts with /rˤ/ as in [i]nhār (he broke down) and nhāṛ (daytime), Cowell denies that an /r/ and /rˤ/ distinction exists in DA.
- DA makes frequent use of doubled (long) consonants and the difference is phonemic. e.g. katab (wrote) and kattab (made someone write), ġani (rich) and ġanni (sing!).
- Usually, the velarisation of one consonant velarises adjacent consonants in a word or even the whole word, but /e/, /i/ and /ə/ can restrain it.

=== Vowels ===
DA typically contains at most eleven different phonemic vowels with six of them (including schwa) being short vowels or at least eight phonemic vowels.

Vowel	Value	DA example	English example
/iː/	[iː]	/fiːd/ (do something useful!)	feed monophthong
/eː/	[eː]	/zeːd/ (male first name)	Scottish English: face
/aː/	[aː]	/haːd/ (this one)	NZE bra
/oː/	[oː]	/xoːd/ (take!)	RP: North
/uː/	[uː]	/huːd/ (Islamic prophet name)	mood monophthong
/i/	[ɪ]	/hidd/ (destroy)	kit monophthong
/e/	[ɛ]	/na:hed/ (male first name)	Traditional RP: bet
/a/	[æ]	/had/ (he destroyed)	Standard Southern British: cat
/o/	[o]	/hidhod/ (hoopoe)	Scottish English go
/u/	[ʊ]	/huda/ (female first name)	Scottish English: foot

- No standard method of writing [e], [o], or [ə] exists in the typical Arabic script. Usually, [e] and [i] are considered both kasrah, [u] and [o] are considered as both dhammah, while [ə] is occasionally represented by both diacritics for DA speakers. Similarly, /e:/ and /i:/ are considered mad bil-ya while /o:/ and /u:/ are considered mad bil-waw. Only six vowels could be written with the standard Arabic script and as such, most speakers of DA can describe them easily in Arabic while this is not the case for the other vowels.
- The phonemic quality of [e], [o] and [ə] is disputed by some researchers who analyse them as allophones; nevertheless, Lentin analyses every non-final syllable /e, i, u, o/ as /ə/ although this /ə/ has different allophones.
- Typically, most diphthongs in Classical Arabic are monophthonged in DA with a fixed pattern: *aw= /o:/, *ay=/e:/, *ey & *əy=/i:/, *əw=/u:/; exceptions to this include: *aww and *ayy are preserved (at the end of syllables they change to *aw and *ay though), morphological constraints occasionally prevent monophthongization and diphthongs could occur as loanwords from Classical Arabic.

=== Intonation ===
One of the most distinctive features of typical DA, which is most pronounced in the old quarters, is the lengthening of the last vowel of interrogative and exclamative sentences. This peculiar intonation has a 'sing-songy' feeling which leads some to call it as 'singing' rather than speaking when compared to Egyptian Arabic.

The actor of 'Moataz' in Bab al-Hara is quite famous for this during fights. This is frequently parodied by non-DA speakers.

== Variation ==
=== MSA influence ===
Due to Syria's education in MSA and global communication, DA is experiencing changes towards classicalism, pseudo-classicalism, neologisms and journalese; local characteristics are rapidly being abandoned in favour of such uses. For example, the traditional zōzi (my husband) is being replaced by žōzi and the new semi-classical variant zōži emerged. This rapid influence can be considered the main difference between the traditional and contemporary DA versions.

=== Religion ===
Velarisation tends to be more pronounced in Christian quarters.

Jews in Iskenderun and Antakya used to speak with dialects quite close to Damascus and Aleppo urban dialects due to their interaction with the Jews there, which differentiated them from people living there. Syrian Jews also used to pronounce Hebrew loanwords containing ח, ע, צ and ט with their biblical Hebrew and Arabic equivalents.

=== Traditional and new quarters ===
Velarisation tends to be more pronounced in old quarters, like in al-Mīdān.
