= John Huehnergard =

Canadian-American linguist

- Born: March 16, 1952 (age 73); Kitchener, Ontario, Canada
- Education: Wilfrid Laurier University (B.A., 1974); Harvard University (Ph.D, with distinction, 1979); University of Chicago (Doctor of Humane Letters [honoris causa], 2014)
- Known for: Semitic languages; Historical and Comparative Linguistics
- Website: academia.edu

John Huehnergard (born March 16, 1952) is a Canadian-American specialist in Semitic languages, notable for his work on categorization, etymology, and historical linguistics.

== Early life and education ==
Huehnergard was born in Kitchener, Ontario, Canada, and was raised in the nearby city of Waterloo, Ontario. He graduated from the Kitchener–Waterloo Collegiate and Vocational School in 1970. He received a B.A. from Wilfrid Laurier University in 1974 and a Ph.D from Harvard University in 1979, where he studied with William L. Moran, Thomas O. Lambdin, and Frank Moore Cross.

== Career ==
Huehnergard began his teaching career at Columbia University as assistant professor there from 1978 to 1983. He was hired at Harvard University in 1983 as an associate professor and received tenure in 1988. He remained at Harvard as Professor of Semitic Philology until 2009, during which time he spent a year at Johns Hopkins University; from Harvard he moved to The University of Texas at Austin. He retired from teaching in May 2017.

== Scholarship ==
Huehnergard is probably best known for his A Grammar of Akkadian, now in its third edition. He is the author or editor of 9 other books, a special issue of the Journal of Language Contact, and over 100 articles and a dozen reviews on topics spanning the languages and cultures of the ancient Near East, particularly focused on categorization, etymology, and historical linguistics. He supplied the etymologies of all English words with Semitic origins to the 4th edition of The American Heritage Dictionary of the English Language (2000, revised in the 5th edition, 2011), plus the Appendix of Semitic Roots and the article, "Proto-Semitic Language and Culture", in both editions. In 2019 he co-edited The Semitic Languages, and wrote the chapter on Proto-Semitic, summarizing a lifetime of research on the topic.

He is known to an entirely different audience as one of the authors of Henry David Thoreau: Speaking for Nature, and in the same vein an article on the "Swamp Milkweed Leaf Beetle".

== Honors and awards ==
Huehnergard was a fellow at the Israel Institute for Advanced Studies in 2002 and held a Guggenheim Fellowship in 2005–2006. He was honored with a Festschrift on his 60th birthday (Language and Nature, ed. N. Pat-El and R. Hasselbach; University of Chicago Press, 2012). He was awarded an honorary doctorate from the University of Chicago in 2014 and the Edward Ullendorff Medal from the British Academy in 2018. He was President of the American Oriental Society in 2017–2018.
