= Arabic grammar =

Grammar of the Arabic language

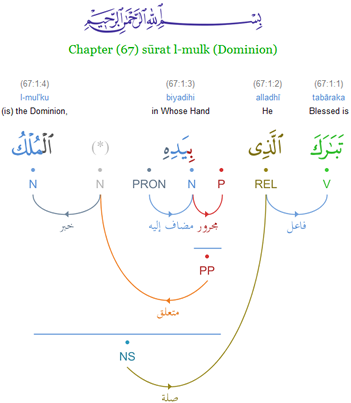
Visualization of Arabic grammar from the Quranic Arabic Corpus

Arabic grammar (Arabic: النَّحْوُ العَرَبِيُّ) is the grammar of the Arabic language. Arabic is a Semitic language and its grammar has many similarities with the grammar of other Semitic languages. Classical Arabic and Modern Standard Arabic have largely the same grammar; colloquial spoken varieties of Arabic can vary in different ways.

The largest differences between classical and colloquial Arabic are the loss of morphological markings of grammatical case; changes in word order, an overall shift towards a more analytic morphosyntax, the loss of the previous system of grammatical mood, along with the evolution of a new system; the loss of the inflected passive voice, except in a few relict varieties; restriction in the use of the dual number and (for most varieties) the loss of the feminine plural. Many Arabic dialects, Maghrebi Arabic in particular, also have significant vowel shifts and unusual consonant clusters. Unlike in other dialects, first person singular verbs in Maghrebi Arabic begin with a n- (ن). This phenomenon can also be found in the Maltese language, which itself emerged from Sicilian Arabic.

== History ==
The identity of the oldest Arabic grammarian is disputed; some sources state that it was Abu al-Aswad al-Du'ali, who established diacritical marks and vowels for Arabic in the mid-600s, Others have said that the earliest grammarian would have been Ibn Abi Ishaq (died AD 735/6, AH 117).

The schools of Basra and Kufa further developed grammatical rules in the late 8th century with the rapid rise of Islam, using Quran as the main source for Arabic grammar rules. From the school of Basra, generally regarded as being founded by Abu Amr ibn al-Ala, two representatives laid important foundations for the field: Al-Khalil ibn Ahmad al-Farahidi authored the first Arabic dictionary and book of Arabic prosody, and his student Sibawayh authored the first book on theories of Arabic grammar. From the school of Kufa, Al-Ru'asi is universally acknowledged as the founder, though his own writings are considered lost, with most of the school's development undertaken by later authors. The efforts of al-Farahidi and Sibawayh consolidated Basra's reputation as the analytic school of grammar, while the Kufan school was regarded as the guardian of Arabic poetry and Arab culture. The differences were polarizing in some cases, with early Muslim scholar Muhammad ibn `Isa at-Tirmidhi favoring the Kufan school due to its concern with poetry as a primary source.

Early Arabic grammars were more or less lists of rules, without the detailed explanations which would be added in later centuries. The earliest schools were different not only in some of their views on grammatical disputes, but also their emphasis. The school of Kufa excelled in Arabic poetry and exegesis of the Qur'an, in addition to Islamic law and Arab genealogy. The more rationalist school of Basra, on the other hand, focused more on the formal study of grammar.

== Division ==
For classical Arabic scholars, the Arabic language sciences are divided into four branches:

- matn al-lughah متن اللُغة (language/lexicon) concerned with collecting and explaining vocabulary.
- aṣ-ṣarf الصَرْف (morphology) determining the form of the individual words.
- an-naḥw النَحْو (syntax) primarily concerned with inflection (i‘rāb).
- al-balāghah البَلاغة (rhetoric) which elucidates stylistic quality, or eloquence.

The grammar or grammars of contemporary varieties of Arabic are a different question. Said M. Badawi, an expert on Arabic grammar, divides Arabic grammar in Egypt into five different types based on the speaker's level of literacy and the degree to which the speaker deviates from Classical Arabic: Illiterate Spoken Arabic (عامِّيّة الأُمِّيِّينِ ‘āmmīyat al-ummiyyīn), Semi-literate Spoken Arabic (عامِّيّة المُتَنَوِّرِينَ ‘āmmīyat al-mutanawwirīn), Educated Spoken Arabic (عامِّيّة اَلمُثَقَّفِينَ ‘āmmīyat al-muthaqqafīn), Modern Standard Arabic (فُصْحَى العَصْر fuṣḥá l-‘aṣr), and Classical Arabic (فُصْحَى التُراث fuṣḥá t-turāth).

== Phonology ==
Classical Arabic has 28 consonantal phonemes, including two semi-vowels, which constitute the Arabic alphabet.

It also has six vowel phonemes (three short vowels and three long vowels). These appear as various allophones, depending on the preceding consonant. Short vowels are not usually represented in the written language, although they may be indicated with diacritics.

Word stress varies from one Arabic dialect to another. A rough rule for word-stress in Classical Arabic is that it falls on the penultimate syllable of a word if that syllable is closed, and otherwise on the antepenultimate.

Hamzat al-waṣl (هَمْزة الوَصْل), elidable hamza, is a phonetic object prefixed to the beginning of a word for ease of pronunciation, since Literary Arabic doesn't allow consonant clusters at the beginning of a word. Elidable hamza drops out as a vowel, if a word is preceding it. This word will then produce an ending vowel, "helping vowel" to facilitate pronunciation. This short vowel may be, depending on the preceding vowel, a fatḥah (فَتْحة: ـَ ), pronounced as /a/; a kasrah (كَسْرة: ـِ ), pronounced as /i/; or a ḍammah (ضَمّة: ـُ ), pronounced as /u/. If the preceding word ends in a sukūn (سُكُون), meaning that it is not followed by a short vowel, the hamzat al-waṣl assumes a kasrah /i/. The symbol ـّ (شَدّة shaddah) indicates gemination or consonant doubling. See more in Tashkīl.

== Nouns and adjectives ==
In Classical Arabic and Modern Standard Arabic (MSA), nouns and adjectives (اِسْمٌ ism) are declined, according to case (i‘rāb), state (definiteness), gender and number. In colloquial or spoken Arabic, there are a number of simplifications such as the loss of certain final vowels and the loss of case. A number of derivational processes exist for forming new nouns and adjectives. Adverbs can be formed from adjectives.

== Pronouns ==
=== Personal pronouns ===
In Arabic, personal pronouns have 12 forms. In singular and plural, the 2nd and 3rd persons have separate masculine and feminine forms, while the 1st person does not. In the dual, there is no 1st person, and only a single form for each 2nd and 3rd person. Traditionally, the pronouns are listed in the order 3rd, 2nd, 1st.

| Person | | Singular | Dual | Plural |
|---|---|---|---|---|
| 1st | | أَنَا anā | نَحْنُ naḥnu | |
| 2nd | masculine | أَنْتَ anta | أَنْتُمَا antumā | أَنْتُمْ antum |
| 2nd | feminine | أَنْتِ anti | أَنْتُمَا antumā | أَنْتُنَّ antunna |
| 3rd | masculine | هُوَ huwa | هُمَا humā | هُمْ hum |
| 3rd | feminine | هِيَ hiya | هُمَا humā | هُنَّ hunna |

Informal Arabic tends to avoid the dual forms antumā أَنْتُمَا and humā هُمَا. The feminine plural forms antunna أَنْتُنَّ and hunna هُنَّ are likewise avoided, except by speakers of conservative colloquial varieties that still possess separate feminine plural pronouns.

==== Enclitic pronouns ====
The enclitic forms of personal pronouns (اَلضَّمَائِر الْمُتَّصِلَة aḍ-ḍamā’ir al-muttaṣilah) are used both as accusative and genitive forms of the pronouns. As genitive forms they appear in the following contexts:

- After the construct state of nouns, where they have the meaning of possessive determiners, e.g. "my, your, his"
- After prepositions, where they have the meaning of objects of the prepositions, e.g. "to me, to you, to him"

As accusative forms they appear:

- Attached to verbs, where they have the meaning of direct object pronouns, e.g. "me, you, him"
- Attached to conjunctions and particles like أَنَّ anna "that ...", لِأَنَّ li-anna "because ...", وَ)لٰكِنَّ)) (wa)lākinna "but ...", إِنَّ inna (topicalizing particle), where they have the meaning of subject pronouns, e.g. "because I ...", "because you ...", "because he ...". (These particles are known in Arabic as akhawāt inna أَخَوَات إِنَّ (lit. "sisters of inna".)

Only the first person singular makes a distinction between the genitive and accusative function. As a possessive it takes the form -ī while as an object form it has the form -nī (e.g. (رَأَيْتَنِي raʼayta-nī "you saw me").

Most of the enclitic forms are clearly related to the full personal pronouns.

| Person | | Singular | Dual | Plural |
|---|---|---|---|---|
| 1st | | ـِي, ـيَ (poss.) -ī/-ya ـنِي (obj.) -nī | ـنَا -nā | |
| 2nd | masculine | ـكَ -ka | ـكُمَا -kumā | ـكُمْ -kum |
| 2nd | feminine | ـكِ -ki | ـكُمَا -kumā | ـكُنَّ -kunna |
| 3rd | masculine | ـهُ, ـهِ -hu/-hi | ـهُمَا, ـهِمَا -humā/-himā | ـهُمْ, ـهِمْ -hum/-him |
| 3rd | feminine | -hā ـهَا | ـهُمَا, ـهِمَا -humā/-himā | ـهُنَّ, ـهِنَّ -hunna/-hinna |

===== Variant forms =====
For all but the first person singular, the same forms are used regardless of the part of speech of the word attached to. In the third person masculine singular, -hu occurs after the vowels u or a (-a, -ā, -u, -ū, -aw), while -hi occurs after i or y (-i, -ī, -ay). The same alternation occurs in the third person dual and plural.

In the first person singular, however, the situation is more complicated. Specifically, -nī "me" is attached to verbs, but -ī/-ya "my" is attached to nouns. In the latter case, -ya is attached to nouns whose construct state ends in a long vowel or diphthong (e.g. in the sound masculine plural and the dual), while -ī is attached to nouns whose construct state ends in a short vowel, in which case that vowel is elided (e.g. in the sound feminine plural, as well as the singular and broken plural of most nouns). Furthermore, -ū of the masculine sound plural is assimilated to -ī before -ya (presumably, -aw of masculine defective -an plurals is similarly assimilated to -ay). Examples:

- From كِتابٌ kitāb "book", pl كُتُبٌ kutub (most of nouns in general).

| Person | Singular | Plural |
|---|---|---|
| Nominative | كِتابِي kitābī | كُتُبِي kutubī |
| Accusative | كِتابِي kitābī | كُتُبِي kutubī |
| Genitive | كِتابِي kitābī | كُتُبِي kutubī |

- From كَلِمةٌ kalimah "word" (nouns ending on ة), pl كَلِمَات or كَلِم.

| Person | Singular | Plural |
|---|---|---|
| Nominative | كَلِمَتِي kalimatī | كَلِمَاتِي kalimātī كَلِمِي kalimī |
| Accusative | كَلِمَتِي kalimatī | كَلِمَاتِي kalimātī كَلِمِي kalimī |
| Genitive | كَلِمَتِي kalimatī | كَلِمَاتِي kalimātī كَلِمِي kalimī |

- From دُنْيَا dunyā "world"; مُسْتَشْفًى mustashfan "hospital" (nouns ending on ـَا ـًا ـَى ـًى).

| Person | Singular | Singular |
|---|---|---|
| Nominative | دُنْيَايَ dunyāya | مُسْتَشْفَايَ mustashfāya |
| Accusative | دُنْيَايَ dunyāya | مُسْتَشْفَايَ mustashfāya |
| Genitive | دُنْيَايَ dunyāya | مُسْتَشْفَايَ mustashfāya |

- From nom. dual مُعَلِّمانَ mu‘allimān "teachers", acc./gen. dual مُعَلِّمَينَ mu‘allimayn (dual nouns)

| Person | Dual |
|---|---|
| Nominative | مُعَلِّمايَ mu‘allimāya |
| Accusative | مُعَلِّمَيَّ mu‘allimayya |
| Genitive | مُعَلِّمَيَّ mu‘allimayya |

- From nom. pl. مُعَلِّمُونَ mu‘allimūn "teachers", acc./gen. pl. مُعَلِّمِينَ mu‘allimīn (regular plural ـُون nouns)

| Person | Plural |
|---|---|
| Nominative | مُعَلِّمِيَّ mu‘allimiyya |
| Accusative | مُعَلِّمِيَّ mu‘allimiyya |
| Genitive | مُعَلِّمِيَّ mu‘allimiyya |

- From pl. مُصْطَفَوْنَ muṣṭafawn "chosen" (regular plural ـَوْن nouns)

| Person | Plural |
|---|---|
| Nominative | مُصْطَفَيَّ muṣṭafayya |
| Accusative | مُصْطَفَيَّ muṣṭafayya |
| Genitive | مُصْطَفَيَّ muṣṭafayya |

- From قاضٍ qāḍin "judge" (active participle nouns ending on ـٍ as nominative)

| Person | Singular |
|---|---|
| Nominative | قاضِيَّ qāḍiyya |
| Accusative | قاضِيَّ qāḍiyya |
| Genitive | قاضِيَّ qāḍiyya |

- From أَبٌ ab "father", long construct form أَبُو abū (long construct nouns)

| Person | Singular |
|---|---|
| Nominative | أَبِيّ abiyya |
| Accusative | أَبايَ abāya |
| Genitive | أَبِيّ abiyya |

- From any nouns ending on ـُو -ū, ـَو -aw or ـِي -ī (more commonly loanwords).

| Person | Singular |
|---|---|
| Nominative | ـِيَّ -iyya |
| Accusative | ـِيَّ -iyya |
| Genitive | ـِيَّ -iyya |

- From any nouns ending on ـَي -ay (more commonly loanwords).

| Person | Singular |
|---|---|
| Nominative | ـَيَّ -ayya |
| Accusative | ـَيَّ -ayya |
| Genitive | ـَيَّ -ayya |

Prepositions use -ī/-ya, even though in this case it has the meaning of "me" (rather than "my"). The "sisters of inna" can use either form (e.g. إنَّنِي inna-nī or إِنِي innī), but the longer form (e.g. إنَّنِي innanī) is usually preferred.

The second-person masculine plural past tense verb ending -tum changes to the variant form -tumū before enclitic pronouns, e.g. كَتَبْتُمُوهُ katabtumūhu "you (masc. pl.) wrote it (masc.)".

===== Pronouns with prepositions =====
Some very common prepositions — including the proclitic preposition li- "to" (also used for indirect objects) — have irregular or unpredictable combining forms when the enclitic pronouns are added to them:

| Meaning | Independent form | With "... me" | With "... you" (masc. sg.) | With "... him" |
|---|---|---|---|---|
| "to", indirect object | لِـ li- | لِي lī | لَكَ laka | لَهُ lahu |
| "in", "with", "by" | بِـ bi- | بِي bī | بِكَ bika | بِهِ bihi |
| "in" | فِي fī | فِيَّ fīya | فِيكَ fīka | فِيهِ fīhi |
| "to" | إلَى ilá | إلَيَّ ilayya | إلَيْكَ ilayka | إلَيْهِ ilayhi |
| "on" | عَلَى ‘alá | عَلَيَّ ‘alayya | عَلَيْكَ ‘alayka | عَلَيْهِ ‘alayhi |
| "with" | مَعَ ma‘a | مَعِي ma‘ī | مَعَكَ ma‘aka | مَعَهُ ma‘ahu |
| "from" | مِنْ min | مِنِّي minnī | مِنْكَ minka | مِنْهُ minhu |
| "on", "about" | عَنْ ‘an | عَنِّي ‘annī | عَنْكَ ‘anka | عَنْهُ ‘anhu |

In the above cases, when there are two combining forms, one is used with "... me" and the other with all other person/number/gender combinations. (More correctly, one occurs before vowel-initial pronouns and the other before consonant-initial pronouns, but in Classical Arabic, only -ī is vowel-initial. This becomes clearer in the spoken varieties, where various vowel-initial enclitic pronouns exist.)

Note in particular:

- إلَى ilá "to" and عَلَى ‘alá "on" have irregular combining forms إلَيْـ ilay-, عَلَيْـ ‘alay-; but other pronouns with the same base form are regular, e.g. مَعَ ma‘a "with".
- لِـ li- "to" has an irregular combining form la-, but بِـ bi- "in, with, by" is regular.
- مِنْ min "from" and عَنْ ‘an "on" double the final n before -ī.

===== Less formal pronominal forms =====
In a less formal Arabic, as in many spoken dialects, the endings -ka, -ki and -hu and many others have their final short vowel dropped, for example, كِتابُكَ kitābuka would become كِتابُك kitābuk for ease of pronunciation. This doesn't make a difference to the spelling as the diacritics used to represent short vowels are not usually written.

=== Demonstratives ===
There are two demonstratives (أَسْماء الإشارة asmā’ al-ishārah), near-deictic ('this') and far-deictic ('that'):

"This, these"
| Gender | | Singular | Dual | Plural |
|---|---|---|---|---|
| Masculine | nominative | هٰذَا hādhā | هٰذانِ hādhāni | هٰؤُلاءِ hā’ulā’i |
| Masculine | accusative/genitive | هٰذَا hādhā | هٰذَيْنِ hādhayni | هٰؤُلاءِ hā’ulā’i |
| Feminine | nominative | هٰذِهِ hādhihī | هاتانِ hātāni | هٰؤُلاءِ hā’ulā’i |
| Feminine | accusative/genitive | هٰذِهِ hādhihī | هاتَيْنِ hātayni | هٰؤُلاءِ hā’ulā’i |

"That, those"
| Gender | | Singular | Dual | Plural |
|---|---|---|---|---|
| Masculine | nominative | ذٰلِكَ ،ذاكَ dhālika, dhāka | ذانِكَ dhānika | أُولٰئكَ ulā’ika |
| Masculine | accusative/genitive | ذٰلِكَ ،ذاكَ dhālika, dhāka | ذَيْنِكَ dhaynika | أُولٰئكَ ulā’ika |
| Feminine | nominative | تِلْكَ tilka | تانِكَ tānika | أُولٰئكَ ulā’ika |
| Feminine | accusative/genitive | تِلْكَ tilka | تَيْنِكَ taynika | أُولٰئكَ ulā’ika |

The dual forms are only used in very formal Arabic.

Some of the demonstratives (hādhā, hādhihi, hādhāni, hādhayni, hā’ulā’i, dhālika, and ulā’ika) should be pronounced with a long ā, although the unvocalised script is not written with alif (ا). Instead of an alif, they have the diacritic ـٰ (dagger alif: أَلِف خَنْجَرِيّة alif khanjarīyah), which doesn't exist on Arabic keyboards and is seldom written, even in vocalised Arabic.

Qur'anic Arabic has another demonstrative, normally followed by a noun in a genitive construct and meaning 'owner of':

"Owner of"
| Gender | | Singular | Dual | Plural |
|---|---|---|---|---|
| Masculine | nominative | ذُو dhū | ذَوَا dhawā | ذَوُو، أُولُو dhawū, ulū |
| Masculine | accusative | ذَا dhā | ذَوَيْ dhaway | ذَوِي، أُولِي dhawī, ulī |
| Masculine | genitive | ذِي dhī | ذَوَيْ dhaway | ذَوِي، أُولِي dhawī, ulī |
| Feminine | nominative | ذاتُ dhātu | ذَواتا dhawātā | ذَواتُ، أُولاتُ dhawātu, ulātu |
| Feminine | accusative | ذَاتَ dhāta | ذَواتَيْ dhawātay | ذَواتِ، أُولاتِ dhawāti, ulāti |
| Feminine | genitive | ذاتِ dhāti | ذَواتَيْ dhawātay | ذَواتِ، أُولاتِ dhawāti, ulāti |

Note that the demonstrative and relative pronouns were originally built on this word. hādhā, for example, was originally composed from the prefix hā- 'this' and the masculine accusative singular dhā; similarly, dhālika was composed from dhā, an infixed syllable -li-, and the clitic suffix -ka 'you'. These combinations had not yet become completely fixed in Qur'anic Arabic and other combinations sometimes occurred, e.g. dhāka, dhālikum. Similarly, the relative pronoun alladhī was originally composed based on the genitive singular dhī, and the old Arabic grammarians noted the existence of a separate nominative plural form alladhūna in the speech of the Hudhayl tribe in Qur'anic times.

This word also shows up in Hebrew, e.g. masculine זה zeh (cf. dhī), feminine זאת zot (cf. dhāt-), plural אלה eleh (cf. ulī).

=== Relative pronoun ===
The relative pronoun is declined as follows:

Relative pronoun ("who, that, which")
| Gender | | Singular | Dual | Plural |
|---|---|---|---|---|
| Masculine | nominative | اَلَّذِي alladhī | اَللَّذانِ alladhāni | اَلَّذِينَ alladhīn(a) |
| Masculine | accusative/genitive | اَلَّذِي alladhī | اَللَّذَيْنِ alladhayni | اَلَّذِينَ alladhīn(a) |
| Feminine | nominative | اَلَّتِي allatī | اَللَّتانِ allatāni | اَللّاتِي allātī |
| Feminine | accusative/genitive | اَلَّتِي allatī | اَللَّتَيْنِ allatayni | اَللّاتِي allātī |

When the relative pronoun serves a function other than the subject of the embedded clause, a resumptive pronoun is required: اَلَّرَجُلُ ٱلَّذِي تَكَلَّمْتُ مَعَهُ al-rajul(u) (a)lladhī takallamtu ma‘a-hu, literally "the man who I spoke with him".The relative pronoun is normally omitted entirely when an indefinite noun is modified by a relative clause: رَجُلٌ تَكَلَّمْتُ مَعَهُ rajul(un) takallamtu ma‘a-h(u) "a man that I spoke with", literally "a man I spoke with him".

=== Colloquial varieties ===
The above system is mostly unchanged in the colloquial varieties, other than the loss of the dual forms and (for most varieties) of the feminine plural. Some of the more notable changes:

- The third-person -hi, -him variants disappear. On the other hand, the first person -nī/-ī/-ya variation is preserved exactly (including the different circumstances in which these variants are used), and new variants appear for many forms. For example, in Egyptian Arabic, the second person feminine singular appears either as -ik or -ki depending on various factors (e.g. the phonology of the preceding word); likewise, the third person masculine singular appears variously as -u, -hu, or - (no ending, but stress is moved onto the preceding vowel, which is lengthened).
- In many varieties, the indirect object forms, which appear in Classical Arabic as separate words (e.g. lī "to me", lahu 'to him'), become fused onto the verb, following a direct object. These same varieties generally develop a circumfix /ma-...-ʃ(i)/ for negation (from Classical mā ... shay’ 'not ... a thing', composed of two separate words). This can lead to complicated agglutinative constructs, such as Egyptian Arabic /ma-katab-ha-ˈliː-ʃ/ 'he didn't write it (fem.) to me'. (Egyptian Arabic in particular has many variant pronominal affixes used in different circumstances, and very intricate morphophonemic rules leading to a large number of complex alternations, depending on the particular affixes involved, the way they are put together, and whether the preceding verb ends in a vowel, a single consonant, or two consonants.)
- Other varieties instead use a separate Classical pseudo-pronoun īyā- for direct objects (but in Hijazi Arabic the resulting construct fuses with a preceding verb).
- Affixation of dual and sound plural nouns has largely vanished. Instead, all varieties possess a separate preposition with the meaning of "of", which replaces certain uses of the construct genitive (to varying degrees, depending on the particular variety). In Moroccan Arabic, the word is dyal (also d- before a noun), e.g. l-kitab dyal-i "my book", since the construct-state genitive is mostly unproductive. Egyptian Arabic has bitā‘ , which agrees in gender and number with the preceding noun (feminine bitā‘it/bita‘t, plural bitū‘ ). In Egyptian Arabic, the construct-state genitive is still productive, hence either kitāb-i or il-kitāb bitā‘-i can be used for "my book" [the difference between them is similar to the difference between 'my book' and 'the book is mine'], but only il-mu‘allimūn bitū‘-i "my teachers".
- The declined relative pronoun has vanished. In its place is an indeclinable particle, usually illi or similar.
- Various forms of the demonstrative pronouns occur, usually shorter than the Classical forms. For example, Moroccan Arabic uses ha l- "this", dak l-/dik l-/duk l- "that" (masculine/feminine/plural). Egyptian Arabic is unusual in that the demonstrative follows the noun, e.g. il-kitāb da "this book", il-bint^{i} di "this girl".
- Some of the independent pronouns have slightly different forms compared with their Classical forms. For example, usually forms similar to inta, inti or enta, enty "you (masc./fem. sg.)" occur in place of anta, anti, and (n)iḥna/eḥna "we" occurs in place of naḥnu.

== Numerals ==
=== Cardinal numerals ===
Numbers behave in a very complicated fashion. wāḥid- "one" and ithnān- "two" are adjectives, following the noun and agreeing with it. thalāthat- "three" through ‘asharat- "ten" require a following noun in the genitive plural, but disagree with the noun in gender, while taking the case required by the surrounding syntax. aḥada ‘ashara "eleven" through tis‘ata ‘ashara "nineteen" require a following noun in the accusative singular, agree with the noun in gender, and are invariable for case, except for ithnā ‘ashara/ithnay ‘ashara "twelve".

The formal system of cardinal numerals, as used in Classical Arabic, is extremely complex. The system of rules is presented below. In reality, however, this system is never used: Large numbers are always written as numerals rather than spelled out, and are pronounced using a simplified system, even in formal contexts.

Example:

Formal: أَلْفَانِ وَتِسْعُمِئَةٍ وَٱثْنَتَا عَشْرَةَ سَنَةً alfāni wa-tis‘u mi’atin wa-thnatā ‘ashrata sanah "2,912 years"
Spoken: ألفين وتسعمئة واثنتا عشرة سنة alfayn wa-tis‘ mīya wa-ithna‘shar sana "2,912 years"
Formal: بَعْدَ أَلْفَيْنِ وَتِسْعِمِئَةٍ وَٱثْنَتَيْ عَشْرَةَ سَنَةً ba‘da alfayni wa-tis‘i mi’atin wa-thnatay ‘ashrata sanah "after 2,912 years"
Spoken: بعد ألفين وتسعمئة واثنتا عشرة سنة ba‘da alfayn wa-tis‘ mīya wa-ithna‘shar sana "after 2,912 years"

Cardinal numerals (الأَعْداد الأَصْلِيّة al-a‘dād al-aṣlīyah) from 0–10. Zero is ṣifr, from which the words "cipher" and "zero" are ultimately derived.

- 0 ٠ ṣifr(un) (صِفْرٌ)
- 1 ١ wāḥid(un) (واحِدٌ)
- 2 ٢ ithnān(i) (اِثْنانِ)
- 3 ٣ thalātha(tun) (ثَلاثةٌ)
- 4 ٤ arba‘a(tun) (أَرْبَعةٌ)
- 5 ٥ khamsa(tun) (خَمْسةٌ)
- 6 ٦ sitta(tun) (سِتّةٌ)
- 7 ٧ sab‘a(tun) (سَبْعةٌ)
- 8 ٨ thamāniya(tun) (ثَمَانِيةٌ)
- 9 ٩ tis‘a(tun) (تِسْعةٌ)
- 10 ١٠ ‘ashara(tun) (عَشَرةٌ) (feminine form ‘ashr(un) عَشْرٌ)

It is very common, even by news announcers and in official speeches, to pronounce numerals in local dialects.

The endings in brackets are dropped in less formal Arabic and in pausa. ة (tā’ marbūṭah) is pronounced as simple /a/ in these cases. If a noun ending in ة is the first member of an idafa, the ة is pronounced as /at/, while the rest of the ending is not pronounced.

اِثْنانِ ithnān(i) is changed to اِثْنَيْنِ ithnayn(i) in oblique cases. This form is also commonly used in a less formal Arabic in the nominative case.

The numerals 1 and 2 are adjectives. Thus they follow the noun and agree with gender.

Numerals 3–10 have a peculiar rule of agreement known as polarity: A feminine referrer agrees with a numeral in masculine gender and vice versa, e.g. thalāthu fatayātin (ثَلَاثُ فَتَيَاتٍ) "three girls". The noun counted takes indefinite genitive plural (as the attribute in a genitive construct).

Numerals 11 and 13–19 are indeclinable for case, perpetually in the accusative. The form is always that of the construct state, whether preceded by a definite article or not: ithnatā ‘ašarata laylatan "twelve nights", al-ithnatā ‘ašarata laylatan "the twelve nights". Numbers 11 and 12 show gender agreement in the ones, and 13–19 show polarity in the ones. Number 12 also shows case agreement in the units. The gender of عَشَر in numbers 11–19 agrees with the counted noun (unlike the standalone numeral 10 which shows polarity). The counted noun takes indefinite accusative singular.

| Number | Informal | Masculine nominative | Masculine oblique | Feminine nominative | Feminine oblique |
|---|---|---|---|---|---|
| 11 | aḥada ‘ashar أَحَدَ عَشَر | aḥada ‘ashara أَحَدَ عَشَرَ | | iḥdá ‘ashrata إحْدَى عَشْرةَ | |
| 12 | ithnā ‘ashar اِثْنَا عَشَر | ithnā ‘ashara اِثْنَا عَشَرَ | ithnay ‘ashara اِثْنَيْ عَشَرَ | ithnatā ‘ashrata اِثْنَتَا عَشْرةَ | ithnatay ‘ashratan اِثْنَتَيْ عَشْرةَ |
| 13 | thalāthata ‘ashar ثَلاثةَ عَشَر | thalāthata ‘ashara ثَلاثةَ عَشَرَ | | thalātha ‘ashrata ثَلاثَ عَشْرةَ | |

Unitary numbers from 20 on (i.e. 20, 30, ... 90, 100, 1000, 1000000, etc.) behave entirely as nouns, showing the case required by the surrounding syntax, no gender agreement, and a following noun in a fixed case. 20 through 90 require their noun to be in the accusative singular; 100 and up require the genitive singular. The unitary numbers themselves decline in various fashions:

- ‘ishrūna "20" through tis‘ūna "90" decline as masculine plural nouns
- mi’at- "100" (مِئة or مِائَة) declines as a feminine singular noun
- alf- "1,000" (أَلْف) declines as a masculine singular noun

The numbers 20–99 are expressed with the units preceding the tens. Both parts decline like independent nouns, taking the tanwīn in the indefinite state. There is agreement in gender with the numerals 1 and 2, and polarity for numerals 3–9. The whole construct is followed by the accusative singular indefinite.

- 20 ‘ishrūna (عِشْرُونَ) (plural of 10)
- 21 wāḥidun wa-‘ishrūna (واحِدٌ وَعِشْرُونَ)
- 22 ithnāni wa-‘ishrūna (اثْنانِ وَعِشْرُونَ)
- 23 thalāthatun wa-‘ishrūna (ثَلاثةٌ وَعِشْرُونَ)
- 30 thalāthūna (ثَلاتُونَ)
- 40 arba‘ūna (أَرْبَعُونَ)

mi’at- "100" and alf- "1,000" can themselves be modified by numbers (to form numbers such as 200 or 5,000) and will be declined appropriately. For example, mi’atāni "200" and alfāni "2,000" with dual endings; thalāthatu ālāfin "3,000" with alf in the plural genitive, but thalāthu mi’atin "300" since mi’at- appears to have no plural.

In compound numbers, the number formed with the last two digits dictates the declension of the associated noun, e.g. 212, 312, and 54,312 would all behave like 12.

Large compound numbers can have, e.g.:

- أَلْفٌ وَتِسْعُ مِئةٍ وَتِسْعُ سِنِينَ alfun wa-tis‘u mi’atin wa-tis‘u sinīna "1,909 years"
- بَعْدَ أَلْفٍ وَتِسْعِ مِئةٍ وَتِسْعِ سِنِينَ ba‘da alfin wa-tis‘i mi’atin wa-tis‘i sinīna "after 1,909 years"
- أَرْبَعةٌ وَتِسْعُونَ أَلْفًا وَثَمَانِي مِئةٍ وَثَلاثٌ وَسِتُّونَ سَنةً arba‘atun wa-tis‘ūna alfan wa-thamānī mi’atin wa-thalāthun wa-sittūna sanatan "94,863 years"
- بَعْدَ أَرْبَعةٍ وَتِسْعِينَ أَلْفًا وَثَمانِي مِئةٍ وَثَلاثٍ وَسِتِّينَ سَنةً ba‘da arba‘atin wa-tis‘īna alfan wa-thamānī mi’atin wa-thalāthin wa-sittīna sanatan "after 94,863 years"
- اِثْنَا عَشَرَ أَلْفًا وَمِئَتانِ وَٱثْنَتانِ وَعِشْرُونَ سَنةً iṯnā ‘ašara alfan wa-mi’atāni wa-thnatāni wa-‘ishrūna sanatan "12,222 years"
- بَعْدَ ٱثْنَيْ عَشَرَ أَلْفًا وَمِئَتَيْنِ وَٱثْنَتَيْنِ وَعِشْرينَ سَنةً ba‘da thnay ‘ashara alfan wa-mi’atayni wa-thnatayni wa-‘ishrīna sanatan "after 12,222 years"
- اِثْنَا عَشَرَ أَلْفًا وَمِئَتانِ وَسَنَتانِ ithnā ‘ashara alfan wa-mi’atāni wa-sanatāni "12,202 years"
- بَعْدَ ٱثْنَيْ عَشَرَ أَلْفًا وَمِئَتَيْنِ وَسَنَتَيْنِ ba‘da thnay ‘ashara alfan wa-mi’atayni wa-sanatayni "after 12,202 years"

Note also the special construction when the final number is 1 or 2:

- alfu laylatin wa-laylatun "1,001 nights"
  أَلْفُ لَيْلةٍ وَلَيْلةٌ
- mi’atu kitābin wa-kitābāni "102 books"
  مِائةُ كِتابٍ وَكِتابانِ

=== Fractions ===
Fractions of a whole smaller than "half" are expressed by the structure fu‘l (فُعْل) in the singular, af‘āl (أَفْعَال) in the plural.

- half niṣfun (نِصْفٌ)
- one-third thulthun (ثُلُثٌ)
- two-thirds thulthāni (ثُلُثَانِ)
- one-quarter rub‘un (رُبُعٌ)
- three-quarters thalāthatu arbā‘in (ثَلَاثَةُ أَرْبَاعٍ)
- etc.

=== Ordinal numerals ===
Ordinal numerals (الأعداد الترتيبية al-a‘dād al-tartībīyah) higher than "second" are formed using the structure fā‘ilun, fā‘ilatun, the same as active participles of Form I verbs:

- m. أَوَّلُ awwalu, f. أُولَى ūlá "first"
- m. ثَانٍ thānin (definite form: اَلثَّانِيُ al-thānī), f. ثَانِيَةٌ thāniyatun "second"
- m. ثالِثٌ thālithun, f. ثالِثةٌ thālithatun "third"
- m. رابِعٌ rābi‘un, f. رابِعةٌ rābi‘atun "fourth"
- m. خامِسٌ khāmisun, f. خامِسةٌ khāmisatun "fifth"
- m. سادِسٌ sādisun, f. سادِسةٌ sādisatun "sixth"
- m. سَابِعٌ sābi‘un, f. سابِعةٌ sābi‘atun "seventh"
- m. ثامِنٌ thāminun, f. ثامِنةٌ thāminatun "eighth"
- m. تاسِعٌ tāsi‘un, f. تاسِعةٌ tāsi‘atun "ninth"
- m. عاشِرٌ ‘āshirun, f. عاشِرةٌ ‘āshiratun "tenth"

They are adjectives, hence there is agreement in gender with the noun, not polarity as with the cardinal numbers. Note that "sixth" uses a different, older root than the number six.

== Verbs ==
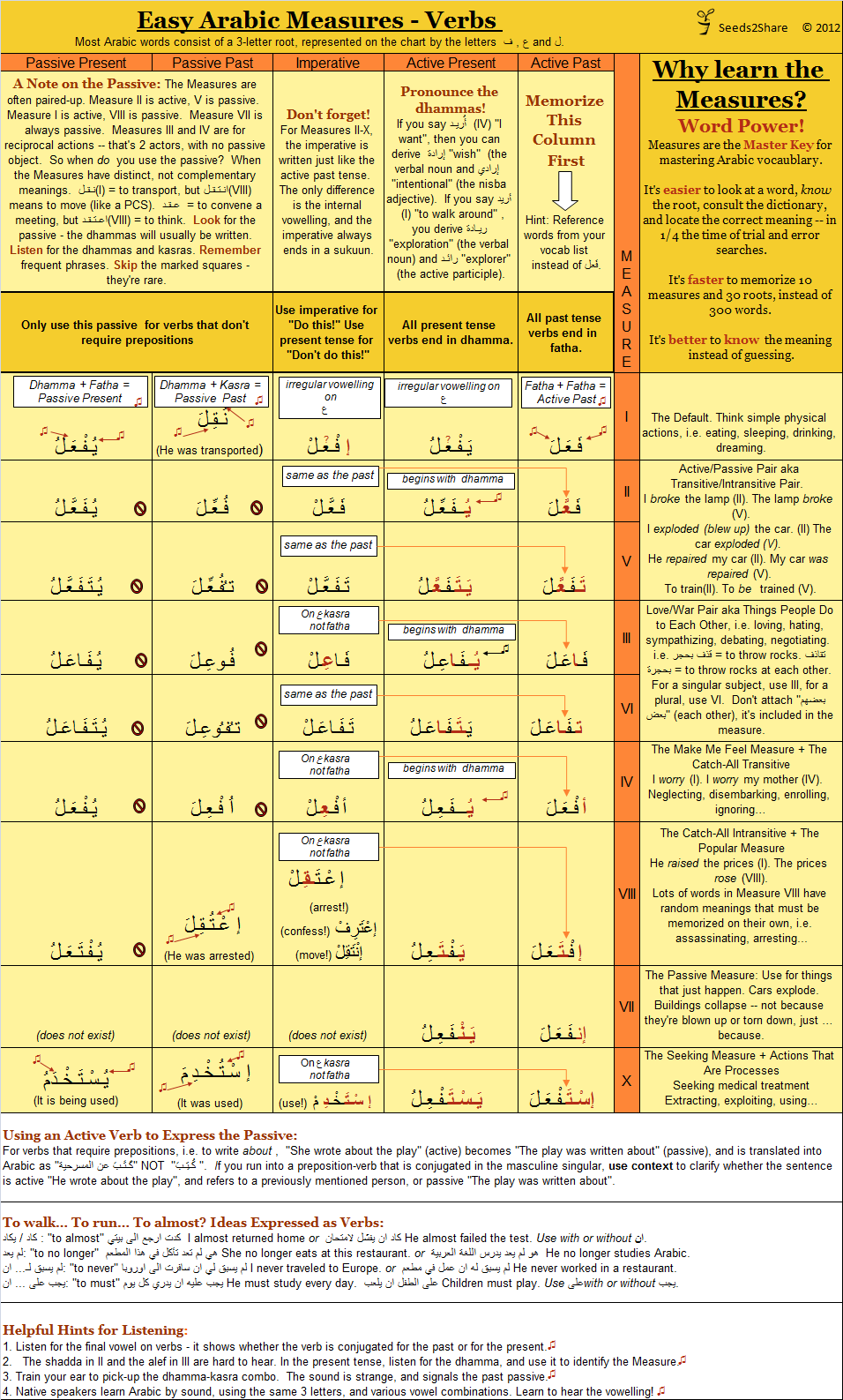
Arabic Verb Chart

Verbs in Arabic (فعل fi‘l) are based on a root made up of three or four consonants (called a triliteral or quadriliteral root, respectively). The set of consonants communicates the basic meaning of a verb, e.g. k-t-b 'write', q-r-’ 'read', ’-k-l 'eat'. Changes to the vowels in between the consonants, along with prefixes or suffixes, specify grammatical functions such as tense, person and number, in addition to changes in the meaning of the verb that embody grammatical concepts such as mood (e.g. indicative, subjunctive, imperative), voice (active or passive), and functions such as causative, intensive, or reflexive.

Since Arabic lacks a verb meaning "to have", constructions using li-, ‘inda, and ma‘a with the pronominal suffixes are used to describe possession. For example: عنده بيت (ʿindahu bayt) – literally: At him (is) a house. → He has a house.

For the negation of Arabic verbs, see Negation in Arabic.

== Prepositions ==
Common prepositions
| | Arabic | English |
|---|---|---|
| True prepositions | بـ bi- | with, in, at |
| True prepositions | تـ ta- | only used in the expression تٱللهِ tallāhi 'I swear to God' |
| True prepositions | لَـ la- | certainly (also used before verbs) |
| True prepositions | لِـ li- | to, for |
| True prepositions | كـ ka- | like, as |
| True prepositions | إلَى ’ilá | to, towards |
| True prepositions | حَتَّى ḥattá | until, up to |
| True prepositions | عَلَى ‘alá | on, over; against |
| True prepositions | عَن ‘an | from, about |
| True prepositions | فِي fī | in, at |
| True prepositions | مَعَ ma‘a (Note: Some grammarians classify the word مَعَ as a noun, not a preposition.) | with, along with |
| True prepositions | مِن min | from; than |
| True prepositions | مُنْذُ mundhu | since |
| True prepositions | مُذْ mudh | since |
| Semi-prepositions | أَمامَ ’amāma | in front of |
| Semi-prepositions | بَيْنَ bayna | between, among |
| Semi-prepositions | تَحْتَ taḥta | under, below |
| Semi-prepositions | حَوْلَ ḥawla | around |
| Semi-prepositions | خارِجَ khārija | outside |
| Semi-prepositions | خِلالَ khilāla | during |
| Semi-prepositions | داخِلَ dākhila | inside |
| Semi-prepositions | دُونَ dūna | without |
| Semi-prepositions | ضِدَّ ḍidda | against |
| Semi-prepositions | عِنْدَ ‘inda | on the part of; at; at the house of; in the possession of |
| Semi-prepositions | فَوْقَ fawqa | above |
| Semi-prepositions | مَعَ ma‘a | with |
| Semi-prepositions | مِثْلَ mithla | like |
| Semi-prepositions | وَراءَ warā’a | behind |

There are two types of prepositions, based on whether they arise from the triconsonantal roots system or not. The 'true prepositions' (حُرُوف اَلْجَرّ ḥurūf al-jarr) do not stem from the triconsonantal roots. These true prepositions cannot have prepositions preceding them, in contrast to the derived triliteral prepositions. True prepositions can also be used with certain verbs to convey a particular meaning. For example, بَحَثَ baḥatha means "to discuss" as a transitive verb, but can mean "to search for" when followed by the preposition عَنْ ‘an, and "to do research about" when followed by فِي fī.

The prepositions arising from the triliteral root system are called "adverbs of place and time" in the native tradition (ظُرُوف مَكان وَظُرُوف زَمان ẓurūf makān wa-ẓurūf zamān) and work very much in the same way as the 'true' prepositions.

A noun following a preposition takes the genitive case. However, prepositions can take whole clauses as their object too if succeeded by the conjunctions أَنْ ’an or أَنَّ ’anna, in which case the subject of the clause is in the nominative or the accusative respectively.

== Syntax ==
=== Genitive construction (iḍāfah) ===
A noun may be defined more precisely by adding another noun immediately afterwards. In Arabic grammar, this is called إضافة iḍāfah ("annexation, addition") and in English is known as the "genitive construct", "construct phrase", or "annexation structure". The first noun must be in the construct form while, when cases are used, the subsequent noun must be in the genitive case. The construction is typically equivalent to the English construction "(noun) of (noun)". This is a very widespread way of forming possessive constructions in Arabic, and is typical of a Semitic language.

Simple examples include:

- بِنْتُ حَسَنٍ bintu Ḥasan "the daughter of Hasan/Hasan's daughter".
- دارُ السَلامِ dāru‿s-salām "the house of peace".
- كِيلُو مَوْزٍ kīlū mawz "a kilo of bananas".
- بَيْتُ رَجُلٍ baytu‿rajul "the house of a man/a man's house".
- بَيْتُ الرَجُلِ baytu‿r-rajul "the house of the man/the man's house".

The range of relationships between the first and second elements of the idafah construction is very varied, though it usually consists of some relationship of possession or belonging. In the case of words for containers, the idāfah may express what is contained: فِنْجانُ قَهْوةٍ finjānu qahwatin "a cup of coffee". The idāfah may indicate the material something is made of: خاتَمُ خَشَبٍ khātamu khashabin "a wooden ring, ring made of wood". In many cases the two members become a fixed coined phrase, the idafah being used as the equivalent of a compound noun used in some Indo-European languages such as English. Thus بَيْتُ الطَلَبةِ baytu al-ṭalabati can mean "house of the (certain, known) students", but is also the normal term for "the student hostel".

=== Word order ===
==== Word order in classical Arabic ====
Classical Arabic tends to prefer the word order VSO (verb before subject before object), but uses the particle ʼinna and SVO (subject before verb) to emphasize the subject. Verb-initial word orders like in Classical Arabic are relatively rare across the world's languages, occurring only in a few language families including Celtic, Austronesian, and Mayan. The different Arabic word orders have an agreement asymmetry: the verb shows person, number, and gender agreement with the subject in SVO constructions but only gender (and possibly person) agreement in VSO, to the exclusion of number.

Modern Standard Arabic tends to use SVO without ʼinna.

Full agreement: SVO order

al-mu‘allimūna qara’u l-kitāb
the-teachers-M.PL.NOM read.PAST-3.M.PL the-book-ACC
'The (male) teachers read the book.'

al-mu‘allimātu qara’na l-kitāb
the-teachers-F.PL-NOM read.PAST-3.F.PL the-book-ACC
'The (female) teachers read the book.'

Partial agreement: VSO order

qara’a l-mu‘allimūna l-kitāb
read.PAST-3M.SG the-teacher-M.PL.NOM the-book-ACC
'The (male) teachers read the book.'

qara’at al-mu‘allimātu l-kitāb
read.PAST-3.F.SG the-teacher-F.PL-NOM the-book-ACC
'The (female) teachers read the book.'

Despite the fact that the subject in the latter two above examples is plural, the verb lacks plural marking and instead surfaces as if it were in the singular form.

Though early accounts of Arabic word order variation argued for a flat, non-configurational grammatical structure, more recent work has shown that there is evidence for a VP constituent in Arabic, that is, a closer relationship between verb and object than verb and subject. This suggests a hierarchical grammatical structure, not a flat one. An analysis such as this one can also explain the agreement asymmetries between subjects and verbs in SVO versus VSO sentences, and can provide insight into the syntactic position of pre- and post-verbal subjects, as well as the surface syntactic position of the verb.

In the present tense, there is no overt copula in Arabic. In such clauses, the subject tends to precede the predicate, unless there is a clear demarcating pause between the two, suggesting a marked information structure. It is a matter of debate in Arabic literature whether there is a null present tense copula which syntactically precedes the subject in verbless sentences, or whether there is simply no verb, only a subject and predicate.

Subject pronouns are normally omitted except for emphasis or when using a participle as a verb (participles are not marked for person). Because the verb agrees with the subject in person, number, and gender, no information is lost when pronouns are omitted. Auxiliary verbs precede main verbs, prepositions precede their objects, and nouns precede their relative clauses.

Adjectives follow the noun they are modifying, and agree with the noun in case, gender, number, and state: For example, فَتَاةٌ جَمِيلَةٌ fatātun jamīlatun 'a beautiful girl' but الفَتاةُ ٱلْجَمِيلةُ al-fatātu al-jamīlatu 'the beautiful girl'. (Compare الفَتاةُ جَمِيلةٌ al-fatātu jamīlatun 'the girl is beautiful'.) Elative adjectives, however, usually do not agree with the noun they modify, and sometimes even precede their noun while requiring it to be in the genitive case.

==== Word order in colloquial spoken Arabic ====
Colloquial spoken Arabic may employ different word order than Classical Arabic or Modern Standard Arabic.

Regarding subject-verb order, Owens et al. (2009), examined three dialects of the Arabian peninsula from a discourse informational and a morpholexical perspective. They show that subject-verb or verb-subject word order is correlated with the lexical class (i.e. pronoun, pronominal, noun), definiteness, and the discourse-defined lexical specificity of a noun. Owens et al. (2009) argue that verb-subject order usually presents events, while subject-verb indicates available referentiality.

In Modern Standard Arabic, the VSO and SVO word orders results in an agreement asymmetry between the verb and the subject: the verb shows person, number, and gender agreement with the subject in SVO constructions, but only gender (and possibly person) agreement in VS, to the exclusion of number. In Lebanese Arabic and Moroccan Arabic, there is agreement between verb and subject in number under both the SV and the VS orders.

| | Lebanese Arabic | Moroccan Arabic | Modern Standard Arabic |
|---|---|---|---|
| SV example | Lə-wlaad neemo. | Lə-wlaad naʕs-u. | ʔal-ʔawlaad-u naamuu. |
| SV example | the-children slept.3p | the-children slept-3P | the-children-NoM slept.3MP |
| SV example | 'The children slept.' | 'The children slept.' | 'The children slept.' |
| VS example | Neemo lə-wlaad. | naʕs-u lə-wlaad | Naama l-ʔawlaad-u. |
| VS example | slept.3p the-children | slept.3p the-children | slept.3Ms the-children-NoM |
| VS example | 'The children slept.' | 'The children slept.' | 'The children slept.' |

El-Yasin (1985) examined colloquial Jordanian Arabic, and concluded that it exhibits a SVO order. This, according to El-Yasin, provides evidence of a language changing from a VSO (CA) into a SVO language (Jordanian Arabic). On the other hand, Mohammad, M. A. (2000) showed that MSA allows all six possible word orders (VSO, SVO, VOS, SOV, OSV, OVS) while Palestinian Arabic (PA) allows only three word orders, namely: VSO, VOS, and SVO.

In her book Spoken Arabic, Brustad, K. (2000) notes that in the dialects she studied (Moroccan, Egyptian, Syrian, and Kuwaiti) verb initial (VSO) and subject initial (SVO) word orders are present. In the case of verb initial word order, it is common that the subject is marked on the verb and is not expressed as an independent verb.

VSO in Syrian Arabic, where the subject is marked on the verb. Adapted from Brustad, K. (2000)
jabit[h]a min maṣɘr min hɘnik la-hOn
brought-she-her from Egypt from there to here

Brustad, K. (2000) points out that if both VSO and SVO are basic typologies in spoken Arabic, then functional typology investigating the semantic and pragmatic roles can shed light on the different contexts where these word orders appear. Despite the analysis that both VS and SV typologies are found in spoken Arabic dialects (Moroccan, Egyptian, Syrian, and Kuwaiti), Brustad, K. (2000) notes that sentence typologies found in spoken Arabic are not limited to these two word orders. She adds that almost any basic constituent may begin an Arabic sentence. She argues that sentences other than VS and SV are marked forms of topic-prominent or subject-prominent sentences.

==== ’inna ====
The subject of a sentence can be topicalized and emphasized by moving it to the beginning of the sentence and preceding it with the word إِنَّ inna 'indeed' (or 'verily' in older translations). An example would be إِنَّ ٱلسَّمَاءَ زَرْقَاءُ inna s-samā’a zarqā’(u) 'The sky is blue indeed'.

’Inna, along with its related terms (or أَخَوَات ’akhawāt "sister" terms in the native tradition) أَنَّ anna 'that' (as in "I think that ..."), inna 'that' (after قَالَ qāla 'say'), وَلٰكِنَّ (wa-)lākin(na) 'but' and كَأَنَّ ka-anna 'as if' introduce subjects while requiring that they be immediately followed by a noun in the accusative case, or an attached pronominal suffix.

| | Arabic | English |
|---|---|---|
| إِنَّ وَأَخَوَاتُهَا 'inna wa ’akhawātuha | إِنَّ 'inna | indeed |
| إِنَّ وَأَخَوَاتُهَا 'inna wa ’akhawātuha | أَنَّ 'anna | that (followed by noun clause) |
| إِنَّ وَأَخَوَاتُهَا 'inna wa ’akhawātuha | كَأَنَّ ka'anna | as, as though |
| إِنَّ وَأَخَوَاتُهَا 'inna wa ’akhawātuha | لكِنَّ lakinna | but |
| إِنَّ وَأَخَوَاتُهَا 'inna wa ’akhawātuha | لَيْتَ layta | to express a wish or desire |
| إِنَّ وَأَخَوَاتُهَا 'inna wa ’akhawātuha | لَعَلَّ la'alla | perhaps |
| إِنَّ وَأَخَوَاتُهَا 'inna wa ’akhawātuha | لَا lā | there is no, there is not |

=== Definite article ===
As a particle, al- does not inflect for gender, number, person, or grammatical case. The sound of the final -l consonant, however, can vary; when followed by a sun letter such as t, d, r, s, n and a few others, it is replaced by the sound of the initial consonant of the following noun, thus doubling it. For example: for "the Nile", one does not say al-Nīl, but an-Nīl. When followed by a moon letter, like m-, no replacement occurs, as in al-masjid ("the mosque"). This affects only the pronunciation and not the spelling of the article.

=== Absolute object (al-maf'ūl al-muṭlaq) ===
The absolute object (المفعول المطلق al-maf'ūl al-muṭlaq) is an emphatic cognate object construction in which a verbal noun derived from the main verb appears in the accusative (منصوب manṣūb) case.

| Arabic | transliteration | English |
|---|---|---|
| ضَحَكَ الوَلَدُ ضَحِكًا | ḍaḥaka l-waladu ḍaḥikan | The boy laughed much. |
| تَدُورُ الأَرْضُ حَوْلَ الشَمْسِ فِي السَنةِ دَوْرةً واحِدةً | tadūru l-'arḍu ḥawla sh-shamsi fi s-sanati dawratan wāḥida | The earth revolves around the sun once a year. |
| أُحِبُّكِ حُبًّا جَمًّا | uḥibbuki ḥubban jamman | I love you so much. |

=== Object of purpose (al-maf'ūl li-'ajlihi) ===
The object of purpose (المفعول لأجله al-maf'ūl li-'ajlihi) is an adverbial structure used to indicate purpose, motive, or reason for an action. It consists of a verbal noun derived from the main verb that appears in the accusative (منصوب manṣūb) case.

| Arabic | transliteration | English |
|---|---|---|
| تَرَكَ بَلَدَهُ بَحْثًا عَنِ الرِزْقِ | taraka baladahu baḥthan 'an ar-rizq | He left his country in search of sustenance. |
| ذَهَبَتْ إلَى الجامِعةِ طَلْبًا لِلْعِلْمِ | dhahabat ila l-jāmi'ati ṭalban lil-'ilm | She went to the university seeking knowledge. |
| كَتَبَ لِحَبِيبَتِهِ رِسالةً عِشْقًا لَهَا | kataba li-ḥabībatih risālatan 'ishqan laha | He wrote his beloved a letter out of love for her. |

=== Dynasty or family ===
Some people, especially in the region of Arabia, when they are descended from a famous ancestor, start their last name with آل āl /ʔaːl/, a noun meaning "family" or "clan", like the dynasty Al Saud (family of Saud) or Al ash-Sheikh (family of the Sheikh). آل āl /ʔaːl/ is distinct from the definite article ال al- /al/.

| Arabic | meaning | transcription | IPA | example |
|---|---|---|---|---|
| ال | the | al- | /al/ | Maytham al-Tammar |
| آل | family/clan of | āl | /ʔaːl/ | Bandar bin Abdulaziz Al Saud |
| أهل | tribe/people of | ahl | /ʔahl/ | Ahl al-Bayt |

=== Other ===
Object pronouns are clitics and are attached to the verb; e.g., أَرَاهَا arā-hā 'I see her'. Possessive pronouns are likewise attached to the noun they modify; e.g., كِتَابُهُ kitābu-hu 'his book'. The definite article اَلـ al- is a clitic, as are the prepositions لِـ li- 'to' and بِـ bi- 'in, with' and the conjunctions كَـ ka- 'as' and فَـ fa- 'then, so'.

== Reform of the Arabic tradition ==
An overhaul of the native systematic categorization of Arabic grammar was first suggested by the medieval philosopher al-Jāḥiẓ, though it was not until two hundred years later when Ibn Maḍāʾ wrote his Refutation of the Grammarians that concrete suggestions regarding word order and linguistic governance were made. In the modern era, Egyptian litterateur Shawqi Daif renewed the call for a reform of the commonly used description of Arabic grammar, suggesting to follow trends in Western linguistics instead.

== See also ==
- Arabic language
- Teaching Arabic as a Foreign Language
- List of Arabic dictionaries
- I‘rab
- Literary Arabic
- Varieties of Arabic
- Arabic alphabet
- Quranic Arabic Corpus
- Romanization of Arabic
- Wiktionary: appendix on Arabic verbs
- WikiBook: Learn Arabic
- Sibawayh
- Ibn Adjurrum
- Ajārūmīya
- Ibn Malik
- Alfiya
- Semitic root
