= ʾIʿrab =

System of suffixes of Classical Arabic

ʾIʿrāb (إِعْرَاب, IPA: [ʔiʕraːb]) is an Arabic term for the declension system of nominal, adjectival, or verbal suffixes of Classical Arabic to mark grammatical case. These suffixes are written in fully vocalized Arabic texts, notably the Qur’ān or texts written for children or Arabic learners, and they are articulated when a text is formally read aloud, but they do not survive in any spoken dialect of Arabic. Even in Literary Arabic, these suffixes are often not pronounced in pausa (ٱلْوَقْف al-waqf); i.e. when the word occurs at the end of the sentence, in accordance with certain rules of Arabic pronunciation. (That is, the nunation suffix -n is generally dropped at the end of a sentence or line of poetry, with the notable exception of the nuniyya; the vowel suffix may or may not be, depending on the requirements of metre.) Depending on the knowledge of ʾiʿrāb, some Arabic speakers may omit case endings when reading aloud in Modern Standard Arabic, thus making it similar to spoken dialects. Many Arabic textbooks for foreigners teach Arabic without a heavy focus on ʾiʿrāb, either omitting the endings altogether or only giving a small introduction. Arabic without case endings may require a different and fixed word order, similar to spoken Arabic dialects.

== Etymology ==
The term literally means 'making [the word] Arabic'. It is the stem IV masdar of the root ‘-r-b (ع-ر-ب), meaning "to be fluent", so ʾiʿrāb means "making a thing expressed, disclosed or eloquent". The term is cognate to the word Arab itself.

== Grammatical cases ==
Case is not shown in standard orthography, with the exception of indefinite accusative nouns ending in any letter but tā’ marbūṭah (ة) or alif followed by hamzah (ء), where the -a(n) "sits" on the letter before an alif added at the end of the word (the alif shows up even in unvowelled texts). Cases, however, are marked in the Qur'an, children's books, and to remove ambiguous situations. If marked, it is shown at the end of the noun. Further information on the types of declensions is discussed in the following section, along with examples. Grammatical case endings are not pronounced in pausa and in less formal forms of Arabic. In vocalised Arabic (where vowel points are written), the case endings may be written even if they are not pronounced. Some Arabic textbooks or children's books skip case endings in vocalised Arabic, thus allowing both types of pronunciation.

=== Nominative case ===
The nominative (al-marfū‘ ٱلْمَرْفُوعُ) is used in several situations:

- For the subject of a verbal sentence.
- For the subject and predicate of a non-verbal (equational) sentence, with some notable exceptions.
- For certain adverbs.
- For the citation form of words.

For singular nouns and broken plurals, it is marked as a usually unwritten ضَمَّة ḍammah (-u) for the definite or ḍammah + nunation (-un) for the indefinite. The dual and regular masculine plural are formed by adding ـَانِ -an(i) and ـُونَ -ūn(a) respectively (just ـَا -ā and ـُو -ū in the construct state). The regular feminine plural is formed by adding ـَاتُ -āt(u) in the definite and ـَاتٌ -āt(un) in the indefinite (same spelling).

=== Accusative case ===
The accusative (al-manṣūb ٱلْمَنْصُوب) has several uses:

- The subject of an equational (non-verbal) sentence, if it is initiated with إن inna, or one of its sisters. The particles are subordinating conjunctions which require that the subject of the subordinate (complement) clause be in the accusative case.
- The predicate of كَانَ / يَكُونُ kāna/yakūnu "be" and its sisters (there are 13 of these verbs). Hence, ٱلْبِنْتُ جَمِيلَةٌ al-bintu jamīlatun 'the girl is beautiful' but ٱلْبِنْتُ كَانَتْ جَمِيلَةً al-bintu kānat jamīlatan 'the girl was beautiful' ("beautiful" is spelled the same way in both cases).
- Both the subject and the predicate of ظَنَ ẓanna and its sisters in an equational clause.
- As the complement of verbs of "seeming".
- The object of a transitive verb
- Most adverbs.
- Semi-prepositions.
- Internal object/cognate accusative structure
- The accusative of specification (al-tamyīz, ٱلتَّمْيِيزُ).
- The accusative of purpose (al-maf‘ūl li-ajlihi, ٱلْمَفْعُولُ لِأَجْلِهِ).
- The circumstantial accusative (al-ḥāl, ٱلْحَال).
- Objects of (kam, كَمْ) 'how much/how many'.
- Cardinal and ordinal numbers from 11, and 13-19
- Counted nouns of numbers 11–99
- Exclamation of astonishment. i.e.: mā ajmalahā!, !مَا أَجْمَلَهَا 'Oh, how beautiful she is!'
- Vocative first term of construct. يَا عبدَ اللهِ yā ‘abd-a-llah! "Oh, Abdallah!"
- Nouns following exceptive particles in non-negative sentences.
- The noun following the absolute, or categorical, negation لَا lā "No".

For singular nouns and broken plurals, it is marked as a usually unwritten فَتْحَة fatḥah (-a) for the definite or fatḥah + nunation (-an) for the indefinite. For the indefinite accusative, the fatḥah + nunation is added to an ا alif, e.g. ـًا, which is added to the ending of all nouns not ending with a alif followed by hamzah or a tā’ marbūṭah. This is the only case (when alif is written), which affects the unvocalised written Arabic (e.g. بَيْتاً bayt-an). The dual and regular masculine plural are formed by adding ـَيْنِ -ayn(i) and ـِينَ -īn(a) respectively (spelled identically!) (ـَيْ -ay and ـِي -ī in the construct state, again, spelled identically). The regular feminine plural is formed by adding ـَاتِ -āt(i) in the definite and -āt(in) in the indefinite (spelled identically). Some forms of indefinite accusative are mandatory even for spoken and pausal forms of Arabic, sometimes -an is changed to a simple -a in pausa or spoken Arabic.

Diptotes never take an alif ending in the written Arabic and are never pronounced with the ending -an.

=== Genitive case ===
The genitive (al-majrūr, ٱلْمَجْرُورُ) is used for:

- Objects of prepositions.
- Construct case: the second, third, fourth, etc. term of an iḍāfah (إِضَافَةٌ genitive construction).
- The object of a locative adverb.
- Elative (comparative/superlative) adjectives behave similarly: أَطْوَلُ وَلَدٍ aṭwalu waladin 'tallest boy'.

For singular nouns and broken plurals, it is marked as a usually unwritten كَسْرَة kasrah (-i) for the definite or kasrah + nunation (-in) for the indefinite. The dual and regular masculine plural are formed by adding ـَيْنِ -ayn(i) and ـِيْنَ -īn(a) respectively (spelled identically) (ـَيْ -ay and ـِي -ī in the construct state, again, spelled identically). The regular feminine plural is formed by adding ـَاتِ -āt(i) in the definite and ـَاتٍ -āt(in) in the indefinite (spelled identically in Arabic).

Note: diptotic nouns receive a fatḥah (-a) in the genitive and are never nunated.
Note: there is no dative case. Instead, the preposition لـِ li- is used.

== Types of declension ==
=== Fully declined nouns (triptotes) ===
For fully declined nouns, known as "triptote" (مُنْصَرِفٌ munṣarif), that is, having three separate case endings, the suffixes are -u, -a, -i for nominative, accusative, and genitive case respectively, with the addition of a final /n/ (nunation, or tanwīn) to produce -un, -an, and -in when the word is indefinite.

This system applies to most singular nouns in Arabic. It also applies to feminine nouns ending in ة -a/-at (tā’ marbūṭah) and ء hamzah, but for these, ا alif is not written in the accusative case. It also applies to many "broken plurals". When words end in -a/-at (tā’ marbūṭah) the t is pronounced when the case ending is added; thus رِسَالَة ("message") is pronounced risāla in pausal form, but in Classical Arabic it becomes رِسَالَةٌ risālatun, رِسَالَةً risālatan, and رِسَالَةٍ risālatin when case endings are added (all usually spelled رسالة when written without the vowel points).

The final /n/ is dropped when the noun is preceded by the definite article al-). The /n/ is also dropped when the noun is used in iḍāfah (construct state), that is, when it is followed by a genitive. Thus:

Nominative (مَرْفُوعٌ marfū‘; literally, "raised"):

baytun بَيْتٌ : a house
al-baytu ٱلْبَيْتُ : the house
baytu r-rajuli بَيْتُ ٱلرَّجُلِ : the house of the man.

Accusative (مَنْصُوبٌ manṣūb); literally, 'erected'):

baytan بَيْتًا : a house
al-bayta ٱلْبَيْتَ : the house
bayta r-rajuli بَيْتَ ٱلرَّجُلِ : the house of the man.

Genitive (مَجْرُورٌ majrūr; literally, 'dragged'):

baytin بَيْتٍ : a house
al-bayti ٱلبَيْتِ : the house
bayti r-rajuli بَيْتِ ٱلرَّجُلِ : the house of the man.

The final /n/ is also dropped in classical poetry at the end of a couplet, and the vowel of the ending is pronounced long.

=== Diptotes ===
A few singular nouns (including many proper names and names of places), and certain types of "broken plural", are known as diptotes (ٱلْمَمْنُوعُ مِنْ ٱلصَّرْفِ al-mamnū‘ min aṣ-ṣarf, literally 'forbidden from inflecting') meaning that they only have two case endings.

When the noun is indefinite, the endings are -u for the nominative and -a for the genitive and accusative with no nunation. The genitive reverts to the normal -i when the diptotic noun becomes definite (preceded by al- or is in the construct state)).

Diptotes never take an alif in the accusative case in written Arabic.

=== Sound masculine plurals ===
In the case of sound masculine plurals (جَمْعُ ٱلْمُذَكَّرُ ٱلسَّالِمُ - jam‘ al-mudhakkar as-sālim), mostly denoting male human beings, the suffixes are respectively ـُونَ -ūna and ـِينَ -īna. These stay the same whether ال al- precedes or not. The final -a is usually dropped in speech. In less formal Arabic only -īna is used for all cases and the final -a is dropped in pausa and in less formal Arabic.

The ن -na is dropped when the noun is in iḍāfah (construct state). Thus:

Nominative:

وَالِدُونَ wālidūna: parents (more than two)
ٱلْوَالِدُونَ al-wālidūna: the parents
وَالِدُو ٱلرِّجَالِ wālidū r-rijāli: the parents of the men

Accusative and genitive:

وَالِدِينَ wālidīna: parents
ٱلْوَالِدِينَ al-wālidīna: the parents
وَالِدِي ٱلرِّجَالِ wālidī r-rijāli: the parents of the men

Note: ending ـِينَ -īna is spelled identically to ـَيْنِ -ayni (see above).

=== Sound feminine plurals ===
In the case of sound feminine plurals (جَمْعُ ٱلْمُؤَنَّثُ ٱلسَّالِمُ jam‘ al-mu’annath as-sālim), the suffixes are respectively ـَاتٌ, ـَاتُ -ātu(n), ـَاتٍ, ـَاتِ -āti(n) and ـَاتٍ, ـَاتِ -āti(n) (identical spelling). The n is only there when the noun is indefinite (not preceded by al-). Again the final vowel is dropped in speech and pausa, leaving only ـَات -āt, making all cases pronounced identically.

The final "n" is dropped when the noun is in iḍāfah (construct state).

Nominative:

مُدَرِّسَاتٌ mudarrisātun: (female) teachers
ٱلْمُدَرِّسَاتُ al-mudarrisātu: the teachers
مُدَرِّسَاتُ ٱلْأَوْلَادِ mudarrisātu l-awlādi: the teachers of the children

Accusative and genitive:

مُدَرِّسَاتٍ mudarrisātin: (female) teachers
ٱلْمُدَرِّسَاتِ al-mudarrisāti: the teachers
مُدَرِّسَاتِ ٱلْأَوْلَادِ mudarrisāti l-awlādi: the teachers of the children

=== Other declensional paradigms ===
The Dual - These nouns denote two of something. They decline very similarly to the sound masculine plurals because they are not marked for definiteness and look the same in both the accusative and genitive cases. For the nominative, the marking is -āni and for the accusative/genitive, -ayni. An example is "parents," which is wālidāni and wālidayni respectively.

ٱسْمُ ٱلْمَنْقُوصِ ism al-manqūṣ (deficient nouns ending with yā’ ) - These nouns behave differently due to the instability of the final vowel. When indefinite, these nouns take a final -in in the nominative/genitive, and -iyan in the accusative. When definite, they take a long -ī in the nominative/genitive, and -iya in the accusative. These nouns were reckoned by the grammarians to have originally taken the triptotic endings, but through morpho-phonotactic processes, the latter resulted. An example is "judge," which is qāḍin, qāḍiyan, versus al-qāḍī, and al-qāḍiya respectively. Also, a noun can be both ism al-manqūṣ and diptotal: for example, layālin 'nights', is a broken plural with a final unstable vowel. With case endings this noun becomes layālin, layāliya, and al-layālī, al-layāliya.

ٱسْمُ ٱلْمَقْصُورِ ism al-maqṣūr (deficient nouns ending with alif or alif maqṣūrah) - These nouns, like their close relative ism al-manqūṣ, also behave differently due to the instability of a final vowel. These nouns are marked only for definiteness, as morpho-phonotactic processes have resulted in the complete loss of the case distinctions. When indefinite, they take -an, which rests on an alif maqṣūrah or occasionally alif. When definite, they are not marked, and they simply retain their long alif or alif maqṣūrah. An example is "hospital," which is mustashfan and al-mustashfā respectively. If a noun is both ism al-maqṣūr and diptotic, then it is completely invariable for case.

Invariable nouns - Invariable nouns are usually those foreign names that end in alif or nouns that end in an additional alif or alif maqṣūrah (when that alif or alif maqṣūrah is not part of the root). Also, nouns that are both ism al-maqṣūr and diptotic fall into this category. Additionally, there are rare invariable nouns which have other endings, like any name ending with "-ayhi," like Sībawayhi (colloquially pronounced, for example, in Egypt: [sebæˈweː]. An example of a common invariable noun is fuṣḥá (al-fuṣḥá), meaning 'the most eloquent [Arabic]'. Another example is dunyā (al-dunyā) 'world'.

== Sentence structure ==
A noun's case depends on the role that the noun plays in the sentence. There are multiple sentence structures in Arabic, each of which demands different case endings for the roles in the sentence. "Subject" does not always correspond to "nominative", nor does "object" always correspond to "accusative". Sentences in Arabic are divided into two branches, of which are the incomplete phrases (jumla inshaiya) and the complete phrases (jumla khabariya). Jumla inshaiya is composed of the descriptive phrase and possessive phrase, while the jumla khabariya is made up of the verbal sentence (jumla fi'lya khabariya) and the nominal sentence (jumla ismiya khabariya). The incomplete phrase cannot be a sentence in itself, and is usually used in the complete phrases.

=== Verbal sentences ===
In a verbal sentence (ٱلْجُمْلَةُ ٱلْفِعْلِيَّةُ al-jumlah al-fi‘līyah), there is verb–subject–object word order. This is the preferred word order of Classical Arabic.

In a verbal sentence, the subject takes nominative case and the object takes accusative case. Such a sentence ("This writer wrote the written") would be formed as follows (read from right to left):

Verbal Sentence
grammatical role	Object	Subject	Verb
Arabic label	مَفْعُولٌ بِهِ maf‘ūl bihi	فَاعِلٌ fā‘il	فِعْلٌ fi‘l
case	accusative	nominative	(verb)
example	ٱلْمَكْتُوبَ l-maktūba (the written)	هٰذَا ٱلْكَاتِبُ hādhā al-kātibu (this writer)	كَتَبَ kataba (wrote)

=== Nominal sentences ===
In a nominal sentence (ٱلْجُمْلَةُ ٱلْاِسْمِيَّةُ al-jumlah al-ismīyah), there is subject–verb–object word order.

==== Equations (no copula verb) ====
If the verb would be "is" (that is, the predicate merely attributes something to the subject—see Predicative (adjectival or nominal)), then there is no verb used. Both the subject and the predicate take nominative case when there is no overt verb. Such a sentence ("This writer is famous") is formed as follows (read from right to left):

Nominal Sentence without Verb
grammatical role	Object	(no verb)	Subject
Arabic label	خَبَر khabar	(no verb)	مُبْتَدَأٌ mubtada’
case	nominative	(no verb)	nominative
example	مَشْهُورٌ mashhūrun (famous)	(no verb)	هٰذَا ٱلْكَاتِبُ hādhā al-kātibu (this writer)

==== Overt verb ====
If there is an overt verb, the subject takes nominative and the predicate takes accusative. Such a sentence ("This writer wrote the book") is formed as follows (read from right to left):

Nominal Sentence with Verb
grammatical role	Object	Verb	Subject
Arabic label	خَبَرٌ khabar	فِعْلٌ fi‘l	مُبْتَدَأٌ mubtada’
case	accusative	(verb)	nominative
example	ٱلْكِتَابَ al-kitāba (the book)	كَتَبَ kataba (wrote)	هٰذَا ٱلْكَاتِبُ hādhā al-kātibu (this writer)

==== Sisters of inna ====
There is a class of words in Arabic called the "sisters of inna" (أَخَوَاتُ إِنَّ akhawāt inna) that share characteristics of إِنَّ. Among them are:

- إِنَّ – inna (particle for emphasis, close to "it is the case that")
- أَنَّ – anna ('that')
- لٰكِنَّ – lākinna (but)
- لِأَنَّ – li-anna ('because')
- كَأَنَّ – ka-anna ('as if', 'as though')

If one of the sisters of إِنَّ begins a clause, then the subject takes accusative case instead of nominative.

Such a sentence using the particle إِنَّ ("Verily, this writer wrote the book") would be formed as follows (read from right to left):

Nominal Sentence with Verb with إنّ
grammatical role	Object	Verb	Subject	Sister of inna
Arabic label	خَبَرٌ khabar	فِعْلٌ fi‘l	مُبْتَدَأٌ mubtada’	أُخْتُ إِنَّ ukht inna
case	accusative	(verb)	accusative	(sister of inna)
example	ٱلْكِتَابَ al-kitāba (the book)	كَتَبَ kataba (wrote)	هٰذَا ٱلْكَاتِبَ hādhā al-kātiba (this writer)	إِنَّ inna (verily)

Although there was an overt verb in the above example, a nominal sentence without an overt verb will also have its subject take accusative case because of the introduction of one of inna's sisters. (The predicate of an equation is unaffected and will remain in the nominative.)

Consider the following example ("Verily, this writer is famous"):

Nominal Sentence without Verb with إِنَّ
grammatical role	Object	(no verb)	Subject	Sister of ʼinna
Arabic label	خَبَرٌ khabar	فِعْلٌ fi‘l	مُبْتَدَأٌ mubtada’	أُخْتُ إِنَّ ukht inna
case	nominative	(no verb)	accusative	(sister of inna)
example	مَشْهُورٌ mashhūrun (famous)	(no verb)	هٰذَا ٱلْكَاتِبَ hādhā al-kātiba (this writer)	إِنَّ inna (verily)

==== With sisters of kāna ====
The verb kāna (كَانَ) and its sisters (أَخَوَاتُ كَانَ akhawāt kāna) form a class of 13 verbs that mark the time/duration of actions, states, and events.

Sentences that use these verbs are considered to be a type of nominal sentence according to Arabic grammar, not a type of verbal sentence. Although the word order may seem to be verb–subject–object when there is no other verb in the sentence, it is possible to have a sentence in which the order is subject–verb–object. Such a non-equation sentence clearly shows subject–verb–object word order.

Among the sisters of kāna are:

- كَانَ – kāna ('was')
- لَيْسَ – laysa ('not')
- مَا زَالَ – mā zāla ('still'; literally, 'has not ceased to be')
- أَصْبَحَ – aṣbaḥa ('reached a state, became')
- ظَلَّ – ẓalla ('remained')

If one of the sisters of كَانَ begins a clause, then the subject takes nominative case and the object takes accusative case. (Because of this, Arabic contrasts [The man]_{NOM} is [a doctor]_{NOM} in the present tense with [The man]_{NOM} was [a doctor]_{ACC} in the past tense.)

Such a sentence using the verb كَانَ ("This writer was famous") would be formed as follows (read from right to left):

Nominal Sentence with كان
grammatical role	Object	Subject	Sister of kāna
Arabic label	خَبَرٌ khabar	ٱسْمٌ ism	أُخْتُ كَانَ ukht kāna
case	accusative	nominative	(sister of kāna)
example	مَشْهُورًا mashhūran (famous)	هٰذَا ٱلْكَاتِبُ hādhā al-kātibu (this writer)	كَانَ kāna (was)

In a sentence with an explicit verb, the sister of kāna marks aspect for the actual verb. A sentence like كَانَ ٱلْكَاتِبُ يَكْتُبُ ٱلْكِتَابَ (was the.writer he.writes the.book, 'the writer was writing the book'), for instance, has both a main verb (يَكْتُبُ) and a sister of kāna that indicates the non-completed aspect of the main verb.

== Verbs ==
The imperfective tense of the verb also has suffixed vowels, which determine the mood of the verb, There are six moods in the Classical Arabic, Thus:

- yaktubu, indicative (مَرْفُوعٌ marfū‘ ), means 'he writes' and sayaktubu means "he will write";
- yaktuba, subjunctive (مَنْصُوبٌ manṣūb), is used in phrases such as "so that he should write";
- yaktub, jussive (مَجْزُومٌ majzūm, literally meaning 'clipped off'), means 'let him write'. This can become yaktubi when required for euphony, e.g. when followed by two consonants.
- uktub, Imperative, means "write!";
- yaktuban, short energetic; its meaning is dependent upon the prefix that is attached to it, but it often means "he (should) write";
- yaktubanna, long energetic; its meaning is dependent upon the prefix that is attached to it, but it often means "he (must) write".

All the first three forms are spelled يكتب in unvocalised Arabic, and the final vowel is not pronounced in pausa and in informal Arabic, leaving just one pronunciation: yaktub.

Traditional Arab grammarians equated the indicative with the nominative of nouns, the subjunctive with the accusative, and the jussive with the genitive, as indicated by their names (the only pair that is not borne out in the name is the jussive-genitive pair, probably because the -i vowel is usually dropped). It is not known whether there is a genuine historical connection or whether the resemblance is mere coincidence, caused by the fact that these are the only three short vowels available.

== See also ==
- Arabic grammar
- Inflection
- Tashkīl
- Arabic diacritics
- Mater lectionis
- Mimation
