= Iḍāfah =

Arabic grammatical structure

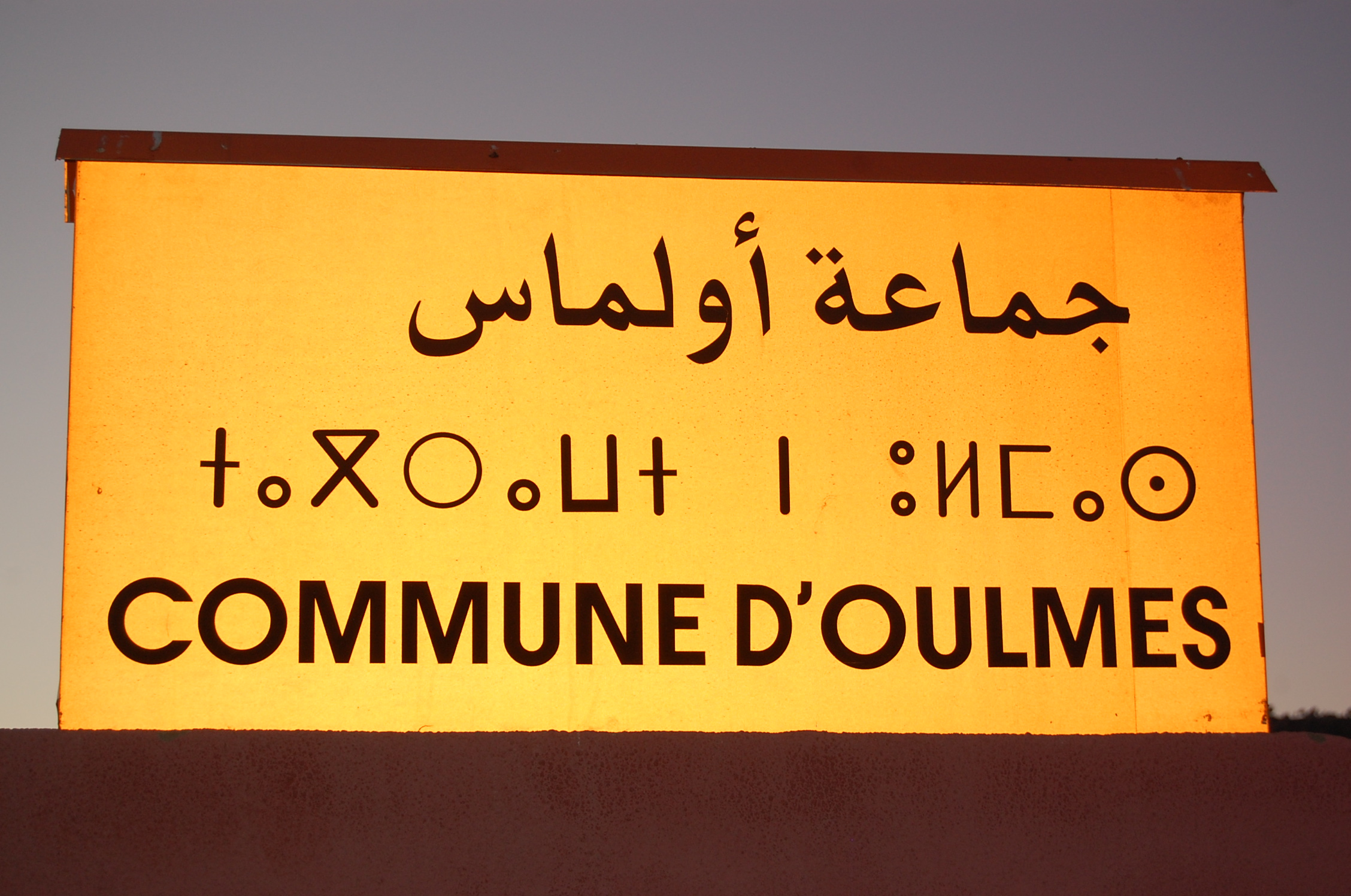
Roadsign in Morocco with the Arabic showing an iḍāfah construction: جماعة أولماس jamāʿat ʾūlmās "Commune of Oulmes", and equivalents in Standard Moroccan Amazigh and French.

Iḍāfah (إضافة) is the Arabic grammatical construct case, mostly used to indicate possession.

Iḍāfah basically entails putting one noun after another: the second noun specifies more precisely the nature of the first noun. In forms of Arabic which mark grammatical case, this second noun must be in the genitive case. The construction is typically equivalent to the English construction "(noun) of (noun)". It is a very widespread way of forming possessive constructions in Arabic, and is typical of a Semitic language. Simple examples include:

- دارُ السَلامِ dāru‿s-salām "the house of peace".
- كِيلُو مَوْزٍ kīlū mawz "a kilo of bananas".
- بِنْتُ حَسَنٍ bintu Ḥasan "the daughter of Hasan/Hasan's daughter".
- بَيْتُ رَجُلٍ baytu rajul "the house of a man/a man's house".
- بَيْتُ الرَجُلِ baytu‿r-rajul "the house of the man/the man's house".

== Terminology ==
The word إضافة, spoken by a male from Tiznit, Morocco.

The Arabic grammatical terminology for this construction derives from the verb أضاف ʼaḍāfa "he added, attached", verb form IV from the hollow root ض ي ف ḍ y f.

- The whole phrase consisting of a noun and a genitive is known in Arabic as إضافة iḍāfah ("annexation, addition") and in English as the "genitive construct", "construct phrase", or "annexation structure".
- The first term in the pair is called المُضاف al-muḍāf "the thing annexed".
- The first term governs (i.e. is modified by) the second term, referred to as المُضاف إلَيْهِ al-muḍāf ilayhi "the thing added to".

== Kinds of relationship expressed ==
The range of relationships between the first and second elements of the idafah construction is very varied, though usually consists of some relationship of possession or belonging. In the case of words for containers, the iḍāfah may express what is contained: فِنْجانُ قَهْوةٍ finjānu qahwatin "a cup of coffee". The iḍāfah may indicate the material something is made of: خاتَمُ خَشَبٍ khātamu khashabin "a wooden ring, ring made of wood". In many cases the two members become a fixed coined phrase, the idafah being used as the equivalent of a compound noun used in some Indo-European languages such as English. Thus بَيْتُ الطَلَبةِ baytu al-ṭalabati can mean "house of the (certain, known) students", but is also the normal term for "the student hostel".

== Forming iḍāfah constructions ==
=== First term ===
The first term in iḍāfah has the following characteristics:

- It must be in the construct state: that is, it does not have the definite article or any nunation (any final -n), or any possessive pronoun suffix.
  - When using a pronunciation that generally omits cases (’i‘rāb), the ة (tā’ marbūṭah) of any term in the construct state must always be pronounced with a -t (after /a/) when spoken, e.g. خالة أَحْمَد khālat ’aḥmad "Ahmad's aunt".
- It can be in any case: this is determined by the grammatical role of the first term in the sentence where it occurs.

=== Second term ===
The second term in iḍāfah has the following characteristics when it is a noun:

- It must be in the genitive case.
- It is marked as definite (with the definite article) or indefinite (with nunation, in those varieties of Arabic that use it), and can take a possessive pronoun suffix. The definiteness or indefiniteness of the second term determines the definiteness of the entire iḍāfah phrase.

=== Three or more terms ===
iḍāfah constructions of multiple terms are possible, and in such cases, all but the final term are in the construct state, and all but the first member are in the genitive case. For example: سَرْقةُ جَوازِ سَفَرِ أِحَدِ اللاعِبِينَ sarqatu jawāzi safari ’aḥadi l-lā‘ibīna "the theft of the passport [literally "license of journey"] of one of the athletes".

== Indicating definiteness in iḍāfah constructions ==
The iḍāfah construction as a whole is a noun phrase. It can be considered indefinite or definite only as a whole. An idafah construction is definite if the second noun is definite, by having the article or being the proper name of a place or person. The construction is indefinite if it the second noun is indefinite. Thus idafah can express senses equivalent to:

- 'the house of the director' (بَيْتُ المُدِيرِ baytu l-mudīr-i)
- 'a house of a director' (بَيْتُ مُدِيرٍ baytu mudīr-in)

But it cannot express a sense equivalent to 'the house of a director': this sense has to be expressed with a prepositional phrase, using a preposition such as لـِـ li-. For example:

- ٍِالبَيْتُ لِمُدِير al-baytu li mudīrin (literally 'the house for/to a director').
- بَيْتُ مُحَمَّدٍ الكَبِيرُ baytu muḥammadini l-kabīru "Muhammad's big house, the big house of Muhammad" (idafah)
  - بَيْتٌ كَبِيرٌ لِمُحَمَّدٍ baytun kabīrun li-muḥammadin "a big house of Muhammad's" (construction with li-)

== Nominal sentences, noun-adjective phrases, and iḍāfah ==
Iḍāfah constructions can typically be distinguished from nominal sentences (جُمْلَة اِسْمِيَّة jumlah 'ismiyyah) and from noun-adjective phrases (اسْمٌ وَصِفَّة ismu wa ṣiffah) by the case ending of the muḍāf ilayhi as well as the definiteness of the nouns.

Iḍāfah	Nominal sentence	Noun-adjective phrase
بِنْتُ جَمِيْلَةٍ	البِنْتُ جَمِيْلَةٌ	بِنْتٌ جَمِيْلَةٌ
bintu jamilatin	al-bintu jamilatun	bintun jamilatun
the daughter of Jamila	The girl is beautiful.	a beautiful girl

== Adjectives and other modifiers in iḍāfah ==
Nothing (except a demonstrative determiner) can appear between the two nouns in iḍāfah. If an adjective modifies the first noun, it appears at the end of the iḍāfah.

=== Modifying the first term ===
An adjective modifying the first noun appears at the end of the iḍāfah and agrees with the noun it describes in number, gender, case, and definiteness (the latter of which is determined by the last noun of the iḍāfah).

first word: gender, case, number	state	Arabic script	transliteration	translation
feminine nominative singular	indefinite (no adjective)	فُرْشاةُ أَسْنانٍ	furshāt-u ’asnān-in	a toothbrush (literally "a brush of teeth")
feminine nominative singular	indefinite (adjective describing first noun)	فُرْشاةُ أَسْنانٍ كَبِيرةٌ	furshāt-u ’asnān-in kabīrat-un	a big toothbrush (literally "a big brush of teeth")
feminine nominative singular	definite (no adjective)	فُرْشاةُ الأَسْنانِ	furshāt-u l-’asnān-i	the toothbrush (literally "brush of the teeth")
feminine nominative singular	definite (adjective describing first noun)	فُرْشاةُ الأَسْنانِ الكَبِيرةُ	furshāt-u l-’asnān-i l-kabīrat-u	the big toothbrush (literally "the big brush of the teeth")
masculine nominative singular	indefinite (no adjective)	طَبِيبُ أَسْنانٍ	ṭabīb-u ’asnān-in	a dentist (literally "doctor of teeth")
masculine nominative singular	indefinite (adjective describing first noun)	طَبِيبُ أَسْنانٍ كَبِيرٌ	ṭabīb-u ’asnān-in kabīr-un	a big dentist (literally "a big doctor of teeth")
masculine nominative singular	definite (no adjective)	طَبِيبُ الأَسْنانٍ	ṭabīb-u l-’asnān-i	the dentist (literally "doctor of the teeth")
masculine nominative singular	definite (adjective describing first noun)	ٌطَبِيبُ الأَسْنانٍ الكَبِيرُ	ṭabīb-u l-’asnān-i l-kabīr-u	the big dentist (literally "the big doctor of the teeth")
feminine nominative singular	proper noun (no adjective)	مَدِينةُ شِيكاغُو	madīnat-u shīkāghū	city of Chicago, the city of Chicago
feminine nominative singular	proper noun (adjective describing first noun)	مَدِينَةُ شِيكَاغُو الكَبِيرةُ	madīnat-u shīkāghū l-kabīrat-u	the big city of Chicago
masculine nominative singular	proper noun (no adjective)	اِبنُ أَحْمَدَ	ibn-u ’aḥmad-a	son of Ahmad, the son of Ahmad
masculine nominative singular	proper noun (adjective describing first noun)	اِبنُ أَحْمَدَ الكَبِيرُ	ibn-u ’aḥmad-a l-kabīr-u	the old son of Ahmad, Ahmad's old son

=== Modifying the last term ===
An adjective modifying the last term appears at the end of the iḍāfah and agrees with the noun it describes in number, gender, definiteness, and case (which is always genitive).

second word (always genitive): gender, number	state	Arabic script	transliteration	translation
feminine singular	indefinite (no adjective)	نَهْرُ مَدِينةٍ	nahr-u madīnat-in	a river of a town
feminine singular	indefinite (adjective describing last noun)	نَهْرُ مَدِينةٍ جَمِيلةٍ	nahr-u madīnat-in jamīlat-in	a river of a beautiful town
feminine singular	definite (no adjective)	نَهْرُ المَدِينةِ	nahr-u l-madīnat-i	the river of the town
feminine singular	definite (adjective describing last noun)	نَهْرُ المَدِينةِ الجَمِيلةِ	nahr-u l-madīnat-i l-jamīlat-i	the river of the beautiful town
masculine singular	indefinite (no adjective)	نَهْرُ بَلَدٍ	nahr-u balad-in	a river of a country
masculine singular	indefinite (adjective describing last noun)	نَهْرُ بَلَدٍ جَمِيلٍ	nahr-u balad-in jamīl-in	a river of a beautiful country
masculine singular	definite (no adjective)	نَهْرُ البَلَدِ	nahr-u l-balad-i	the river of the country
masculine singular	definite (adjective describing last noun)	نَهْرُ البَلَدِ الجَمِيلِ	nahr-u l-balad-i l-jamīl-i	the river of the beautiful country

=== Modifying both terms ===
If both terms in the iḍāfah are modified, the adjective modifying the last term is set closest to the iḍāfah, and the adjective modifying the first term is set further away. For example:

majma‘-u l-lughat-i l-‘arabiyyat-i l-’urdunniyy-u
academy the-language the-Arabic the-Jordanian
"the Jordanian Arabic Language Academy"

== Iḍāfah constructions using pronouns ==
The possessive suffix can also take the place of the second noun of an iḍāfah construction, in which case it is considered definite. Indefinite possessed nouns are also expressed via a preposition.

Person		Singular	Dual	Plural
1st		ـِي, ـيَ (poss.) -ī/-ya ـنِي (obj.) -nī	ـنَا -nā	
2nd	masculine	ـكَ -ka	ـكُمَا -kumā	ـكُمْ -kum
2nd	feminine	ـكِ -ki	ـكُمَا -kumā	ـكُنَّ -kunna
3rd	masculine	ـهُ, ـهِ -hu/-hi	ـهُمَا, ـهِمَا -humā/-himā	ـهُمْ, ـهِمْ -hum/-him
3rd	feminine	ـهَا -hā	ـهُمَا, ـهِمَا -humā/-himā	ـهُنَّ, ـهِنَّ -hunna/-hinna

=== Variant forms ===
For all but the first person singular, the same forms are used regardless of the part of speech of the word attached to. In the third person masculine singular, -hu occurs after the vowels u or a (-a, -ā, -u, -ū, -aw), while -hi occurs after i or y (-i, -ī, -ay). The same alternation occurs in the third person dual and plural.

صَدِيقَتُهَا ṣadīqatu-hā "her friend"
صَدِيقَتُهَا الجَدِيدةُ ṣadīqatu-hā l-jadīdatu "her new friend"
صَدِيقةٌ لَهَا ṣadīqatun la-hā "a friend of hers"
صَدِيقةٌ جَدِيدةٌ لَهَا ṣadīqatun jadīdatun la-hā "a new friend of hers"

In the first person singular, however, the situation is more complicated; -ī/-ya "my" is attached to nouns. In the latter case, -ya is attached to nouns whose construct state ends in a long vowel or diphthong (e.g. in the sound masculine plural and the dual), while -ī is attached to nouns whose construct state ends in a short vowel, in which case that vowel is elided (e.g. in the sound feminine plural, as well as the singular and broken plural of most nouns). Furthermore, -ū of the masculine sound plural is assimilated to -ī before -ya (presumably, -aw of masculine defective -an plurals is similarly assimilated to -ay). Examples:

- From كِتابٌ kitāb "book", pl كُتُبٌ kutub (most of nouns in general).

Person	Singular	Plural
Nominative	كِتابِي kitābī	كُتُبِي kutubī
Accusative	كِتابِي kitābī	كُتُبِي kutubī
Genitive	كِتابِي kitābī	كُتُبِي kutubī

- From كَلِمةٌ kalimah "word" (nouns ending on ة), pl كَلِمَات or كَلِم.

Person	Singular	Plural
Nominative	كَلِمَتِي kalimatī	كَلِمَاتِي kalimātī كَلِمِي kalimī
Accusative	كَلِمَتِي kalimatī	كَلِمَاتِي kalimātī كَلِمِي kalimī
Genitive	كَلِمَتِي kalimatī	كَلِمَاتِي kalimātī كَلِمِي kalimī

- From دُنْيَا dunyā "world"; مُسْتَشْفًى mustashfan "hospital" (nouns ending on ـَا ـًا ـَى ـًى).

Person	Singular	Singular
Nominative	دُنْيَايَ dunyāya	مُسْتَشْفَايَ mustashfāya
Accusative	دُنْيَايَ dunyāya	مُسْتَشْفَايَ mustashfāya
Genitive	دُنْيَايَ dunyāya	مُسْتَشْفَايَ mustashfāya

- From nom. dual مُعَلِّمانَ mu‘allimān "teachers", acc./gen. dual مُعَلِّمَينَ mu‘allimayn (dual nouns)

Person	Dual
Nominative	مُعَلِّمايَ mu‘allimāya
Accusative	مُعَلِّمَيَّ mu‘allimayya
Genitive	مُعَلِّمَيَّ mu‘allimayya

- From nom. pl. مُعَلِّمُونَ mu‘allimūn "teachers", acc./gen. pl. مُعَلِّمِينَ mu‘allimīn (regular plural ـُون nouns)

Person	Plural
Nominative	مُعَلِّمِيَّ mu‘allimiyya
Accusative	مُعَلِّمِيَّ mu‘allimiyya
Genitive	مُعَلِّمِيَّ mu‘allimiyya

- From pl. مُصْطَفَوْنَ muṣṭafawn "chosen" (regular plural ـَوْن nouns)

Person	Plural
Nominative	مُصْطَفَيَّ muṣṭafayya
Accusative	مُصْطَفَيَّ muṣṭafayya
Genitive	مُصْطَفَيَّ muṣṭafayya

- From قاضٍ qāḍin "judge" (active participle nouns ending on ـٍ as nominative)

Person	Singular
Nominative	قاضِيَّ qāḍiyya
Accusative	قاضِيَّ qāḍiyya
Genitive	قاضِيَّ qāḍiyya

- From أَبٌ ab "father", long construct form أَبُو abū (long construct nouns)

Person	Singluar
Nominative	أَبِيّ abiyya
Accusative	أَبايَ abāya
Genitive	أَبِيّ abiyya

- From any nouns ending on ـُو -ū, ـَو -aw or ـِي -ī (more commonly loanwords).

Person	Singluar
Nominative	ـِيَّ -iyya
Accusative	ـِيَّ -iyya
Genitive	ـِيَّ -iyya

- From any nouns ending on ـَي -ay (more commonly loanwords).

Person	Singluar
Nominative	ـَيَّ -ayya
Accusative	ـَيَّ -ayya
Genitive	ـَيَّ -ayya

=== Pronominal nouns in most of Arabic dialects ===
Person		Singular	Plural
1st		ـِي, ـيَ (poss.) -ī/-ya ـنِي (obj.) -nī	ـنَا -nā
2nd	masculine	ـَك -ak	ـكُمْ -kum
2nd	feminine	ـِك -ik	ـكُمْ -kum
3rd	masculine	ـُه، ـه -uh, -h	ـهُمْ -hum
3rd	feminine	ـهَا -hā	ـهُمْ -hum

- From كِتابٌ kitāb "book", pl كُتُبٌ kutub (most of nouns in general).

Person		Singular	Plural
1st		كِتابِي kitāb-ī	كِتابنا kitāb-nā
2nd	masculine	كِتابَك kitāb-ak	كِتابكُم kitāb-kum
2nd	feminine	كِتابِك kitāb-ik	كِتابكُم kitāb-kum
3rd	masculine	كِتابُه kitāb-uh	كِتابهُم kitāb-hum
3rd	feminine	كِتابْهَا kitāb-hā	كِتابهُم kitāb-hum

- From كِلْمة kilma "word" (nouns ending on ة).

Person		Singular	Plural
1st		كِلْمَتِي kilmat-ī	كِلْمَتْنا kilmat-nā
2nd	masculine	كِلْمَتَك kilmat-ak	كِلْمَتْكُم kilmat-kum
2nd	feminine	كِلْمَتِك kilmat-ik	كِلْمَتْكُم kilmat-kum
3rd	masculine	كِلْمَتُه kilmat-uh	كِلْمَتْهُم kilmat-hum
3rd	feminine	كِلْمَتْهَا kilmat-hā	كِلْمَتْهُم kilmat-hum

- From دُنْيا dunyā "world"

Person		Singular	Plural
1st		دُنْيايَ dunyā-ya	دُنْيانا dunyā-nā
2nd		دُنْياك dunyā-k	دُنْياكُم dunyā-kum
3rd	masculine	دُنْياه dunyā-h	دُنْياهُم dunyā-hum
3rd	feminine	دُنْياهَا dunyā-hā	دُنْياهُم dunyā-hum

- From أَب ab "father"

Person		Singular	Plural
1st		أَبُويَ abū-ya	أَبُونا abū-nā
2nd		أَبُوك abū-k	أَبُوكُم abū-kum
3rd	masculine	أَبُوه abū-h	أَبُوهُم abū-hum
3rd	feminine	أَبُوهَا abū-hā	أَبُوهُم abū-hum
