= Construct state =

Morphological form of a noun

In Afro-Asiatic languages, the first noun in a genitive phrase that consists of a possessed noun followed by a possessor noun often takes on a special morphological form, which is termed the construct state (Latin status constructus). For example, in Arabic and Hebrew, the word for "queen" standing alone is malika ملكة and malka מלכה respectively, but when the word is possessed, as in the phrase "Queen of Sheba" (literally "Sheba's Queen"; or, rather, "Queen-of Sheba"), it becomes malikat sabaʾ ملكة سبأ and malkat šəva מלכת שבא respectively, in which malikat and malkat are the construct state (possessed) form and malika and malka are the absolute (unpossessed) form.

The phenomenon is particularly common in Semitic languages (such as Arabic, Hebrew, and Syriac), in Berber languages, and in the extinct Egyptian language.

In Semitic languages, nouns are placed in the construct state when they are modified by another noun in a genitive construction. That differs from the genitive case of European languages in that it is the head (modified) noun rather than the dependent (modifying) noun which is marked. However, in Semitic languages with grammatical case, such as Classical Arabic, the modifying noun in a genitive construction is placed in the genitive case in addition to marking the head noun with the construct state (compare, e.g., "John's book" where "John" is in the genitive [possessive] case and "book" cannot take definiteness marking (a, the) like in the construct state).

In some non-Semitic languages, the construct state has various additional functions besides marking the head noun of a genitive construction.

Depending on the particular language, the construct state of a noun is indicated by various phonological properties (for example, different suffixes, vowels or stress) and/or morphological properties (such as an inability to take a definite article).

In traditional grammatical terminology, the possessed noun in the construct state ("Queen") is the nomen regens ("governing noun"), and the possessor noun, often in the genitive case ("Sheba's"), is the nomen rectum ("governed noun").

== Semitic languages ==
In the older Semitic languages, the use of the construct state is the standard (often only) way to form a genitive construction with a semantically definite modified noun. The modified noun is placed in the construct state, which lacks any definite article (despite being semantically definite), and is often phonetically shortened (as in Biblical Hebrew). The modifying noun is placed directly afterwards, and no other word can intervene between the two, though in Biblical Hebrew a prefix often intervenes, as in the case of śimḥat ba/qāṣîr in Isaiah 9:2. For example, an adjective that qualifies either the modified or modifying noun must appear after both. (This can lead to potential ambiguity if the two nouns have the same gender, number and case; otherwise, the agreement marking of the adjective will indicate which noun is modified.) In some languages, e.g. Biblical Hebrew and the modern varieties of Arabic, feminine construct-state nouns preserve an original -t suffix that has dropped out in other circumstances.

In some modern Semitic languages, the use of the construct state in forming genitive constructions has been partly or completely displaced by the use of a preposition, much like the use of the modern English "of", or the omission of any marking. In these languages (e.g. Modern Hebrew and Moroccan Arabic), the construct state is used mostly in forming compound nouns. An example is Hebrew bet ha-sefer "the school", lit. "the house of the book"; bet is the construct state of bayit "house". Alongside such expressions, the construct state is sometimes neglected, such as in the expression mana falafel (a portion of falafel), which should be menat falafel using the construct state. However, the lack of a construct state is generally considered informal, and is inappropriate for formal speech.

=== Arabic ===
In Arabic grammar, the construct state is used to mark the first noun (the thing possessed) in the genitive construction. The second noun of the genitive construction (the possessor) is marked by the genitive case.

In Arabic, the genitive construction is called إضافة ʼiḍāfah (literally "attachment") and the first and second nouns of the construction are called مضاف muḍāf ("attached"; also the name for the construct state) and مضاف إليه muḍāf ʼilayhi ("attached to"). These terms come from the verb أضاف ʼaḍāfa "he added, attached", verb form IV from the root ض-ي-ف ḍ-y-f (Form I: ضاف ḍāfa) (a hollow root). In this conceptualization, the possessed thing (the noun in the construct state) is attached to the possessor (the noun in the genitive case).

The construct state is one of the three grammatical states of nouns in Arabic, the other two being the indefinite state and the definite state. Concretely, the three states compare like this:

Different noun states in Classical Arabic, using the noun ملكة malikah "queen"
State	Noun form	Meaning	Example	Meaning
Indefinite	ملكةٌ malikatun	"a queen"	ملكةٌ جميلةٌ malikatun jamīlatun	"a beautiful queen"
Definite	الملكةُ al-malikatu	"the queen"	الملكةُ الجميلة al-malikatu l-jamīlah	"the beautiful queen"
Construct	ملكةُ malikatu	"a/the queen of ..."	ملكةُ البلدِ الجميلةُ malikatu l-baladi l-jamīlatu	"the beautiful queen of the country"
Construct	ملكةُ malikatu	"a/the queen of ..."	ملكةُ بلدٍ جميلة malikatu baladin jamīlah	"a beautiful queen of a country"

Different noun states in Egyptian Arabic, using the noun ملكة malikah "queen"
State	Noun form	Meaning	Example	Meaning
Indefinite	ملكة malikah	"a queen"	ملكة جميلة malikah gamilah	"a beautiful queen"
Definite	الملكة el-malikah	"the queen"	الملكة الجميلة el-malikah el-gamilah	"the beautiful queen"
Construct	ملكة malik(e)t	"a/the queen of ..."	ملكة البلد الجميلة malikt el-balad el-gamilah	"the beautiful queen of the country"
Construct	ملكة malik(e)t	"a/the queen of ..."	ملكة بلد جميلة maliket balad gamilah	"a beautiful queen of a country"

In Classical Arabic, a word in the construct state is semantically definite if the following word is definite. The word in the construct state takes neither the definite article prefix al- nor the indefinite suffix -n (nunation), since its definiteness depends on the following word. Some words also have a different suffix in the construct state, for example masculine plural mudarrisūna "teachers" vs. mudarrisū "the teachers of ...". Formal Classical Arabic uses the feminine marker -t in all circumstances other than before a pause, but the normal spoken form of the literary language omits it except in a construct-state noun. This usage follows the colloquial spoken varieties of Arabic.

In the spoken varieties of Arabic, the use of the construct state has varying levels of productivity. In conservative varieties (e.g. Gulf Arabic), it is still extremely productive. In Egyptian Arabic, both the construct state and the particle بِتَاع, bitāʿ, 'of' can be used, e.g. كِتَاب أَنْوَر, kitāb Anwar, 'Anwar's book' or الكِتَاب بِتَاع أَنْوَر, il-kitāb bitāʿ Anwar, 'the book of Anwar'. In Moroccan Arabic, the construct state is used only in forming compound nouns; in all other cases, dyal "of" or d- "of" is used. In all these varieties, the longer form with the "of" particle (a periphrastic form) is the normal usage in more complicated constructions (e.g. with an adjective qualifying the head noun, as in the above example "the beautiful queen of the nation") or with nouns marked with a dual or sound plural suffix.

=== Aramaic ===
In Aramaic, genitive noun relationships can either be built using the construct state or with a relative particle, *ḏī > dī, which became a prefix d- in Late Aramaic. "The king's house" can be expressed in several ways:

- בית מלכא "(the) house of the king"
- ביתא די מלכא or ביתא דמלכא "the house, that of the king"
- ביתיה די מלכא or ביתיה דמלכא "his house, that of the king"

In later Aramaic, the construct state became less common.

=== Hebrew ===
In Hebrew grammar, the construct state is known as smikhut ([smiˈχut]) (סמיכות, lit. "support" (the noun), "adjacency"). Simply put, smikhut consists of combining two nouns, often with the second noun combined with the definite article, to create a third noun.

בַית — /ˈbajit/ — "(a) house"
הבַית — /ha-ˈbajit/ — "the house"
בֵית — /be(j)t/ — "house-of"
ספר — /ˈsefer/ — "(a) book"
בֵית ספר — /be(j)t ˈsefer/ — "(a) school" (literally "house(-of) book")
בֵית הספר — /be(j)t ha-ˈsefer/ — "the school" (formal; literally "house(-of) the book")

עוגה — /ʕuˈɡa/ — "cake" (feminine)
גבינה — /ɡviˈna/ — "cheese"
עוגת גבינה — /ʕuˈɡat ɡviˈna/ — "cheesecake"

דיבור — /diˈbur/ — "speech"
חופש — /ˈħofeʃ/ — "freedom" (an example of a noun for which the smikhut-form is identical to the regular form)
חופש דיבור — /ˈħofeʃ diˈbur/ — "freedom of speech" (literally "freedom(-of) speech")
חופש הדיבור — /ˈħofeʃ ha-diˈbur/ — "the freedom of speech" (literally "freedom(-of) the speech")

As in Arabic, the smikhut construct state, the indefinite, and definite states may be expressed succinctly in a table:

Different noun states in Hebrew with סמיכות smikhut, using the feminine singular noun מלכה malka "queen"
State	Noun form	Meaning	Example	Meaning
Indefinite	מלכה malkah	"a queen"	מלכה יפה malka yafa	"a beautiful queen"
Definite	המלכה ha-malkah	"the queen"	המלכה היפה ha-malkah ha-yafah	"the beautiful queen"
Construct	מלכת malkat	"a/the queen of ..."	מלכת המדינה היפה malkat ha-medina ha-yafah	"the queen of the beautiful country"
Construct	מלכת malkat	"a/the queen of ..."	מלכת מדינה יפה malkat medina yafah	"a queen of a beautiful country"

Different noun states in Hebrew with סמיכות smikhut, using the plural masculine noun תפוחים tapuḥim "apples"
State	Noun form	Meaning	Example	Meaning
Indefinite	תפוחים tapuḥim	"apples"	תפוחים ירוקים tapuḥim y'ruqim	"green apples"
Definite	התפוחים ha-tapuḥim	"the apples"	התפוחים הירוקים ha-tapuḥim ha-y'ruqim	"the green apples"
Construct	תפוחי tapuḥe	"a/the apples of ..."	תפוחי העץ הזה tapuḥe ha-etz ha-zeh	"the apples of this tree"
Construct	תפוחי tapuḥe	"a/the apples of ..."	תפוחי אדמה tapuḥe adamah	"apples of earth" (in Modern Hebrew "potatoes")

==== Modern Hebrew ====
Modern Hebrew grammar makes extensive use of the preposition shel (evolved as a contraction of she-le- "which (is belonging) to") to mean both "of" and "belonging to". The construct state (סמיכות smikhút) — in which two nouns are combined, the first being modified or possessed by the second — is not highly productive in Modern Hebrew. Compare the classical Hebrew construct-state with the more analytic Israeli Hebrew phrase, both meaning "the mother of the child", i.e. "the child's mother":

’em ha-yéled
mother:CONSTRUCT the-child

ha-íma shel ha-yéled
the-mother of the-child

However, the construct state is still used in Modern Hebrew fixed expressions and names, as well as to express various roles of the dependent (the second noun), including:

- A qualifier

repúblika-t banánot
"Banana Republic"

hofaa-t bkhora
performance-CONSTRUCT precedence
"premiere"

- A domain

mevakér ha-mdiná
critic:CONSTRUCT the-state
"the State Comptroller"

more derekh
teacher:CONSTRUCT way
"guide"

- A complement

orekh din
arranger:CONSTRUCT law
"lawyer"

- A modifier

menora-t kir
lamp-CONSTRUCT wall
"wall lamp"

Hebrew adjectival phrases composed of an adjective and a noun feature adjectives in the construct state, as in:

sh'vúr lév
broken-CONSTRUCT heart
"heartbroken"

== Berber ==
In Berber, the construct state is used for the possessor, for objects of prepositions, nouns following numerals, and subjects occurring before their verb (modified from the normal VSO order).

In some cases, (not) applying the construct state could completely alter the meaning of the phrase. The Berber particle d means "and" and "is/are". To decrease the confusion the Berber word for "and" can be written "ed". Also, a large number of Berber verbs are both transitive and intransitive, according to context. In the intransitive case, the construct state is required for the subject.

Examples:

- Aryaz ed weryaz — lit. "The man and the man" — (instead of *Aryaz ed aryaz).
- Taddart en weryaz — lit. "The house of the man" — (instead of *Taddart en aryaz).
- Aɣyul ed userdun — lit. "The donkey and the mule" — (instead of *Aɣyul ed aserdun).
- Udem en temɣart — lit. "The face of the woman" — (instead of *Udem en tamɣart).
- Afus deg ufus — lit. "Hand in hand" — (instead of *Afus deg afus).
- Semmust en terbatin — lit. "Five girls" — (instead of *Semmust en tirbatin).
- Yecca ufunas — "The bull has eaten" — (while Yecca afunas means: "He ate a bull").
- Ssiwlent temɣarin - "The ladies have spoken" - (instead of *Ssiwlent timɣarin).

Due to the difference in function between the construct state in Berber and its better-known function in Semitic languages, linguists such as Maarten Kossmann prefer the term "annex state".

== Dholuo ==
The Dholuo language (one of the Luo languages) shows alternations between voiced and voiceless states of the final consonant of a noun stem. In the "construct state" (the form that means 'hill of', 'stick of', etc.) the voicing of the final consonant is switched from the absolute state. (There are also often vowel alternations that are independent of consonant mutation.)

- /ɡɔt/ 'hill' (abs.), /god/ (const.)
- /lʊθ/ 'stick' (abs.), /luð/ (const.)
- /kɪdo/ 'appearance' (abs.), /kit/ (const.)
- /tʃoɡo/ 'bone' (abs.), /tʃok/ (const.)
- /buk/ 'book' (abs.), /bug/ (const.)
- /kɪtabu/ 'book' (abs.), /kɪtap/ (const.)

== Similarities in other language groups ==
=== Celtic languages ===
It has been noted since the 17th century that Welsh and other Insular Celtic languages have a genitive construction similar to the Afro-Asiatic construct state in which only the last noun can take the definite article:

- Breton:

dor an ti
door the house
'the door of the house'

- Welsh:

drŵs y tŷ
door the house
'the door of the house'

merch rheolwr y banc
daughter manager the bank
'the bank manager's daughter'

- Irish:

doras an tí
door.NOM the.GEN.SG.M house.GEN
'the door of the house'

Compare, for example:

bāb al-bayt
door the-house
'the door of the house'

bāb-u l-bayt-i
door.NOM the-house.GEN

It has been suggested that the Insular Celtic languages may have been influenced by an Afro-Asiatic substrate language or that languages in both groups were influenced by a common substrate language that is now entirely lost. However, it is also possible that the similarities with the construct state are coincidental.

=== Nahuatl ===
Classical Nahuatl grammar distinguished a non-possessed form in nouns (suffixed with -tl or -in) and a possessed form (without a suffix but bearing a prefix marking the possessor). The possessed form is comparable to Afro-Asiatic construct state. An example would be cihuātl ("woman, wife") vs. nocihuāuh ("my wife", prefix no- "my").

== See also ==
- Compound (linguistics)
- Definiteness
