= Modern Standard Arabic =

Standardized literary variety of Arabic

- العربية الفصحى الحديثة al-ʻArabīyah al-Fuṣḥā al-Ḥadīthah (Note: Spelling for the final letter yāʼ differs in Egypt, Sudan and sometimes other regions as Yemen. It is always undotted ى, hence عربى فصيح.)
- al-ʻArabīyah written in Arabic (Naskh script)
- Pronunciation: /al ʕaraˈbijjatu lˈfusˤħah/, see variations (Note: Pronunciation varies regionally. The following are examples: The Levant: [al ʕaraˈbɪjja lˈfʊsˤħa], colloquially: [(e)l-]; Hejaz: [al ʕaraˈbijjalˈfusˤħa]; East central Arabia: [æl ʢɑrɑˈbɪjjɐ lˈfʊsˤʜɐ], colloquially: [el-]; Egypt: [æl ʕɑɾɑˈbejjɑ lˈfosˤħɑ], colloquially: [el-]; Libya: [æl ʕɑrˤɑˈbijjæ lˈfusˤħæ], colloquially: [əl-]; Tunisia: [æl ʕɑrˤɑˈbeːjæ lˈfʊsˤħæ], colloquially: [el-]; Algeria, Morocco: [æl ʕɑrˤɑbijjæ lfusˤħæ], colloquially: [l-])
- Region: Arab world Middle East and North Africa
- Users: 335 million (2023)
- Language family: Afro-Asiatic: Semitic; West Semitic; Central Semitic; Arabic; Modern Standard Arabic
- Early forms: Proto-Arabic: Old Arabic; Pre-classical Arabic; Classical Arabic
- Writing system: Arabic alphabet

Official status
- Official language in: 24 countries, 3 states with limited recognition; Organizations including the AU, Arab League, OIC and UN
- Recognised minority language in: Israel
- Regulated by: See article

Language codes
- ISO 639-3: arb
- Glottolog: stan1318
- Sole official language Co-official language, majority Arabophone Co-official language, minority Arabophone No official status, minority Arabophone

Modern Standard Arabic (MSA) or Modern Written Arabic (MWA) is the variety of standardized, literary Arabic that developed in the Arab world in the late 19th and early 20th centuries, and in some usages also the variety of spoken Arabic that approximates this written standard. MSA is the language used in literature, academia, print, mass media, and law and legislation, though it is generally not spoken as a first language, similar to Contemporary Latin. It is a pluricentric standard language taught throughout the Arab world in formal education, differing significantly from many vernacular varieties of Arabic that are commonly spoken as mother tongues in the area; these are only partially mutually intelligible with both MSA and with each other depending on their proximity in the Arabic dialect continuum.

Native speakers of Arabic generally do not distinguish between "Modern Standard Arabic" and "Classical Arabic" as separate languages; they refer to both as Fuṣḥā Arabic or al-ʻArabīyah al-Fuṣḥā (العربية الفصحى), meaning "the most eloquent Arabic". They consider the two forms to be two historical periods of one language. When the distinction is made, they do refer to MSA as Fuṣḥā al-ʻAṣr (فصحى العصر), meaning "Contemporary Fuṣḥā" or "Modern Fuṣḥā", and to CA as Fuṣḥā at-Turāth (فصحى التراث), meaning "Hereditary Fuṣḥā" or "Historical Fuṣḥā".

Many linguists, nonetheless, consider MSA to be distinct from Classical Arabic (CA; اللغة العربية الفصحى التراثية al-Lughah al-ʻArabīyah al-Fuṣḥā at-Turāthīyah) – the written language prior to the mid-19th century – although there is no agreed moment at which CA turned into MSA. There are also no agreed set of linguistic criteria which distinguish CA from MSA; however, MSA differs most markedly in that it either synthesizes words from Arabic roots (such as سيارة car (Sayyārah) or باخرة steamship (Bākhirah)) or adapts words from foreign languages (such as ورشة workshop (Warshah) or إنترنت Internet (Inṭirnēt)) to describe industrial and post-industrial life.

== History ==
=== Classical Arabic ===
Classical Arabic, also known as Quranic Arabic, is the language used in the Quran as well as in numerous literary texts from Umayyad and Abbasid times (7th to 9th centuries). Many Muslims study Classical Arabic in order to read the Quran in its original language. Written Classical Arabic underwent fundamental improvements during the early Islamic era, adding dots to distinguish similarly written letters and adding the tashkīl (diacritical markings that guide pronunciation) by scholars such as Abu al-Aswad al-Du'ali and Al-Khalil ibn Ahmad al-Farahidi to preserve the correct form and pronunciation of the Quran and to defend the Arabic language against linguistic corruption. It was the lingua franca across the Middle East and North Africa during classic times and in Al-Andalus before classic times.

=== Emergence of Modern Standard Arabic ===
Napoleon's invasion of Egypt and Syria (1798–1801) is generally considered to be the starting point of the modern period of the Arabic language, when the intensity of contacts between the Western world and Arabic culture increased. Napoleon introduced a printing press in Egypt in 1798; it briefly disappeared after the French departure in 1801, but Muhammad Ali Pasha, who also sent students to Italy, France, and England to study military and applied sciences in 1809, reintroduced it a few years later in Boulaq, Cairo. (Previously, Arabic-language presses had been introduced locally in Lebanon in 1610, and in Aleppo, Syria in 1702). The first Arabic printed newspaper was established in 1828: the bilingual Turkish–Arabic Al-Waqa'i' al-Misriyya had great influence in the formation of Modern Standard Arabic. It was followed by Al-Ahram (1875) and al-Muqattam (1889). The Western–Arabic contacts and technological developments in especially the newspaper industry indirectly caused the revival of Arabic literature, or Nahda, in the late 19th and early 20th century. Another important development was the establishment of Arabic-only schools in reaction against the Turkification of Arabic-majority areas under Ottoman rule.

=== Current situation ===
Modern Standard Arabic (MSA) is the literary standard across the Middle East, North Africa, and Horn of Africa and is one of the six official languages of the United Nations. Most printed material in the Arab League—including most books, newspapers, magazines, official documents, and reading primers for small children—is written in MSA. "Colloquial" Arabic refers to the many regional dialects derived from Classical Arabic spoken daily across the region and learned as a first language, and as a second language if people speak other languages native to their particular country. They are not normally written, although a certain amount of literature (particularly plays and poetry, including songs) exists in many of them.

Modern Standard Arabic (MSA) is the official language of the Arab League, an official language of every Arab League country, and the only form of Arabic taught in schools at all stages. Additionally, all Muslims recite prayers in the language as do some religious minorities, notably some Christian denominations and Druze, as it is considered the liturgical language. Translated versions of the Bible which are used in Arabic-speaking countries are mostly written in MSA, aside from Classical Arabic. Revised editions of numerous literary texts from Umayyad and Abbasid times are also written in MSA.

The sociolinguistic situation of Arabic in modern times provides a prime example of the linguistic phenomenon of diglossia – the use of two distinct varieties of the same language, usually in different social contexts. This diglossic situation facilitates code-switching in which a speaker switches back and forth between the two dialects of the language, sometimes even within the same sentence. People speak MSA as a third language if they speak other languages native to a country as their first language and colloquial Arabic dialects as their second language. Modern Standard Arabic is also spoken by people of Arab descent outside the Arab world when speakers of different dialects communicate with each other. As there is a prestige or standard dialect of vernacular Arabic, speakers of standard colloquial dialects code-switch between these particular dialects and MSA.

Classical Arabic is considered normative; a few contemporary authors attempt (with varying degrees of success) to follow the syntactic and grammatical norms laid down by classical grammarians (such as Sibawayh) and to use the vocabulary defined in classical dictionaries (such as the Lisan al-Arab, Arabic: لِسَان الْعَرَب). However, the exigencies of modernity have led to the adoption of numerous terms which would have been mysterious to a classical author, whether taken from other languages (e. g. فيلم film) or coined from existing lexical resources (e. g. هاتف hātif "caller" > "telephone"). Structural influence from foreign languages or from the vernaculars has also affected Modern Standard Arabic: For example, MSA texts sometimes use the format "A, B, C and D" when listing things, whereas Classical Arabic prefers "A and B and C and D", and subject-initial sentences may be more common in MSA than in Classical Arabic. For these reasons, Modern Standard Arabic is generally treated separately in non-Arab sources. Speakers of Modern Standard Arabic do not always observe the intricate rules of Classical Arabic grammar. Modern Standard Arabic principally differs from Classical Arabic in three areas: lexicon, stylistics, and certain innovations on the periphery that are not strictly regulated by the classical authorities. On the whole, Modern Standard Arabic is not homogeneous; there are authors who write in a style very close to the classical models and others who try to create new stylistic patterns. Add to this regional differences in vocabulary depending upon the influence of the local Arabic varieties and the influences of foreign languages, such as French in Africa and Lebanon or English in Egypt, Jordan, and other countries.

As MSA is a revised and simplified form of Classical Arabic, MSA in terms of lexicon omitted the obsolete words used in Classical Arabic. As diglossia is involved, various Arabic dialects freely borrow words from MSA. This situation is similar to Romance languages, wherein scores of words were borrowed directly from formal Latin (most literate Romance speakers were also literate in Latin); educated speakers of standard colloquial dialects speak in this kind of communication.

Reading aloud in MSA for various reasons is becoming increasingly simpler, using less strict rules compared to CA. Notably, the inflection is omitted, making it closer to spoken varieties of Arabic. It depends on the speaker's knowledge and attitude to the grammar of Classical Arabic, as well as the region and the intended audience.

Pronunciation of native words, loanwords, and foreign names in MSA is loose. Names can be pronounced or even spelled differently in different regions and by different speakers. Pronunciation also depends on the person's education, linguistic knowledge, and abilities. There may be sounds used which are missing in Classical Arabic but exist in colloquial varieties, such as the consonants /v/, /p/, /t͡ʃ/ (often realized as [t]+[ʃ]) (which may or may not be written with special letters) and the vowels [o], [e] (both short and long). There are no special letters in Arabic to distinguish between [e~i] and [o~u] pairs but the sounds o and e (short and long) exist in the colloquial varieties of Arabic and some foreign words in MSA.

== Phonology ==
=== Consonants ===
Modern Standard Arabic consonant phonemes
		Labial	Dental	Alveolar		Palato- alveolar	Palatal	Velar	Uvular	Pharyngeal	Glottal
		Labial	Dental	plain	emphatic	Palato- alveolar	Palatal	Velar	Uvular	Pharyngeal	Glottal
Nasal		m ⟨م⟩		n ⟨ن⟩							
Stop	voiceless			t ⟨ت⟩	tˤ ⟨ط⟩			k ⟨ك⟩	q ⟨ق⟩		ʔ ⟨ء⟩
Stop	voiced	b ⟨ب⟩		d ⟨د⟩	dˤ ⟨ض⟩	d͡ʒ (Note: The standard consonant varies regionally, most prominently [d͡ʒ] in the Arabian Peninsula, parts of the Levant, Iraq, and northern Algeria and Sudan, [ʒ] in most of Northwest Africa and the Levant, [g] in Egypt, Oman, and coastal Yemen.) ⟨ج⟩					
Fricative	voiceless	f ⟨ف⟩	θ ⟨ث⟩	s ⟨س⟩	sˤ ⟨ص⟩	ʃ ⟨ش⟩		x ~ χ ⟨خ⟩		ħ ⟨ح⟩	h ⟨ه⟩
Fricative	voiced		ð ⟨ذ⟩	z ⟨ز⟩	ðˤ ⟨ظ⟩			ɣ ~ ʁ ⟨غ⟩		ʕ ⟨ع⟩	
Trill				r ⟨ر⟩							
Approximant				l ⟨ل⟩	ɫ (Note: The marginal phoneme /ɫ/ only occurs in the word الله /aɫ.ɫaːh/ ('The God') and words derived from it.)		j ⟨ي⟩	w ⟨و⟩			

=== Vowels ===
Modern Standard Arabic, like Classical Arabic before it, has three pairs of long and short vowels: /a/, /i/, and /u/:

Modern Standard Arabic vowel phonemes
	Short		Long	
	Front	Back	Front	Back
Close	i	u	iː	uː
Mid	i	u	(eː)*	(oː)*
Open	a		aː	

* Although not part of Standard Arabic phonology, the vowels /eː/ and /oː/ are perceived as separate phonemes in most of modern Arabic dialects, and they are used when speaking Modern Standard Arabic in foreign words and when speaking with a colloquial tone.

- Across North Africa and West Asia, short /i/ may be realized as [ɪ ~ e ~ ɨ] before or adjacent to emphatic consonants and [q], [r], [ħ], [ʕ] depending on the accent.
- Short /u/ can also have different realizations, i.e. [ʊ ~ o ~ ʉ], sometimes with a different value for each length, short and long, and sometimes with two different values.
- In Egypt close vowels have different values: short initial or medial [e], [o] ← instead of /i, u/.
- In some dialects /i~ɪ/ and /u~ʊ/ become /e/ and /o/, respectively.
- Allophones of /a/ and /aː/ include [ɑ] and [ɑː] before or adjacent to emphatic consonants and [q], [r], and [æ] and [æː] elsewhere.
- Allophones of /iː/ include [ɪː]~[ɨː] before or adjacent to emphatic consonants and [q], [r], [ħ], [ʕ].
- Allophones of /uː/ include [ʊː]~[ɤː]~[oː] before or adjacent to emphatic consonants and [q], [r], [ħ], [ʕ].
- Unstressed final long /aː, iː, uː/ are most often shortened or reduced: /aː/ → [æ ~ ɑ], /iː/ → /i/, /uː/ → [o~u].
- Although not part of Standard Arabic phonology, the vowels /eː/ and /oː/ are perceived as separate phonemes in most Mashriqi Arabic dialects and they can be used when speaking Modern Standard Arabic in foreign words and when speaking with a colloquial tone.

== Differences between Modern Standard Arabic and Classical Arabic ==
While there are differences between Modern Standard Arabic and Classical Arabic, Arabic speakers tend to find these differences unimportant, and generally refer to both by the same name: Fuṣḥā Arabic or al-ʻArabīyah al-Fuṣḥā (العربية الفصحى), meaning "the most eloquent Arabic". When the distinction is made, they do refer to MSA as Fuṣḥā al-ʻAṣr (فصحى العصر), meaning "Contemporary Fuṣḥā" or "Modern Fuṣḥā", and to CA as Fuṣḥā at-Turāth (فصحى التراث), meaning "Hereditary Fuṣḥā" or "Historical Fuṣḥā".

=== Differences in syntax ===
MSA tends to use simplified sentence structures and drop more complicated ones commonly used in Classical Arabic. Some examples include reliance on verb sentences (sentences that begin with a verb) instead of noun phrases and semi-sentences, as well as avoiding phrasal adjectives and accommodating feminine forms of ranks and job titles.

=== Differences in terminology ===
Because MSA speech occurs in fields with novel concepts, including technical literature and scientific domains, the need for terms that did not exist in the time of CA has led to coining new terms. Arabic Language Academies had attempted to fulfill this role during the second half of the 20th century with neologisms with Arab roots, but MSA typically borrows terms from other languages to coin new terminology.

=== Differences in pronunciation ===
For some speakers MSA can include sounds not present in CA, like /eː/, /oː/, /t͡ʃ/, /p/ and /v/, which occur in loanwords.

== Regional variants ==
MSA is loosely uniform across the Middle East as it is based on the convention of Arabic speakers rather than being a regulated language (that is, despite the number of academies regulating Arabic). It can be thought of as being in a continuum between CA (the regulated language described in grammar books) and the spoken vernaculars while leaning much more to CA in its written form than its spoken form.

Regional variations exist due to influence from the spoken vernaculars. TV hosts who read prepared MSA scripts, for example in Al Jazeera, are ordered to give up national or ethnic pronunciations by changing their pronunciation of certain phonemes (e.g. the realization of the Classical jīm ج as [ɡ] by Egyptians), though other traits may show the speaker's region, such as the stress and the precise values of vowels and the pronunciations of other consonants. People who speak MSA also mix vernacular and Classical in pronunciation, words, and grammatical forms. Classical–vernacular mixing in formal writing can also be found (e.g., in some Egyptian newspaper editorials); other works are written with Modern-Standard–vernacular mixing, including entertainment news.

== Speakers ==
According to Ethnologue, there are nearly 335 million (more precisely 334,765,000) users of Modern Standard Arabic in the world, but no native speakers. They add "In most Arab countries, only the well-educated have adequate proficiency in Modern Standard Arabic." People who are literate in Modern Standard Arabic are primarily found in countries of the Arab League, where it is compulsory in most schools. People who are literate in the language are usually more so passively, as they mostly use the language in reading and writing, not in speaking. In Morocco, Algeria, and Tunisia, French is the language of higher education in science, technology, engineering, and mathematics (STEM), while in the Gulf region it is English.

Countries where Modern Standard Arabic is spoken by a significant number of speakers, (Ethnologue 28th edition, 2025)
No.	Country	Total speakers
1	Algeria	35,400,000 (2023)
2	Bahrain	817,000 (2023)
3	Chad	903,000 (2023)
4	Djibouti	103,000 (2023)
5	Egypt	77,200,000 (2023)
6	Eritrea	1,410,000 (2023)
7	Iraq	35,100,000 (2023)
8	India	2,270,000 (2011)
9	Israel	1,860,000 (2023)
10	Jordan	8,580,000 (2023)
11	Kuwait	3,730,000 (2023)
12	Lebanon	4,780,000 (2023)
13	Libya	6,250,000 (2023)
14	Mauritania	2,510,000 (2023)
15	Morocco	27,300,000 (2023)
16	Oman	2,250,000 (2023)
17	Palestine	5,070,000 (2023)
18	Qatar	2,100,000 (2023)
19	Saudi Arabia	28,900,000 (2023)
20	Somalia	3,110,000 (2023)
21	South Sudan	2,900,000 (2023)
22	Sudan	27,100,000 (2023)
23	Syria	20,200,000 (2023)
24	Tunisia	9,790,000 (2023)
25	United Arab Emirates	3,490,000 (2023)
26	Western Sahara	306,000 (2023)
27	Yemen	21,300,000 (2023)

Several reports mentioned that the use of Modern Standard Arabic is either stagnant or on the decline in the Arab world, especially in Gulf countries where foreign workers make up more than three-quarters of the population and where English has become the lingua franca of commerce, media, and education. Content in Modern Standard Arabic is also under-represented online and in literature.

According to the 2017 Arab Youth Survey done by polling firm PSB Insights, 24% of respondents (young urban Arabs aged 18 to 24) in non-GCC countries agreed with the statement "On a daily basis, I use English more than Arabic." In GCC countries the fraction was 56%. The New York Times reported that most Arab students of Northwestern University in Qatar and Georgetown University in Qatar did not have "professional proficiency" in Modern Standard Arabic, partly also due to a different local form of Arabic, Gulf Arabic, being the medium of instruction in state schools in the Gulf.

== Sample ==
"What does the Wikimedia Foundation do" narrated in MSA

Phrase	English translation	IPA	Romanization (ALA-LC)
العربية	Arabic	/alʕaraˈbij.ja/	al-ʻArabīyah
الإنجليزية/الإنكليزية	English	(varies) /alʔing(i)li(ː)ˈzij.ja/	(may vary) al-ing(i)līzīyah
مرحباً	Hello	/marħaban/	marḥaban
السلام عليكم	Peace [be] with you (lit. upon you)	/assaˈlaːmu ʕaˈlajkum/	as-salāmu ʻalaykum
ما اسمك؟	What is your name?	/masmuk, -ki/	masmuka / -ki?
كيف حالك؟	How are you?	/ˈkajfa ˈħaːluk, -luki/	kayfa ḥāluk, ḥāluki
شكراً	Thanks	/ˈʃukran/	shukran
أَهْلًا وَسَهْلًا	Welcome	/ʔahlan wa sahlan/	ahlan wa-sahlan
إِلَى اللِّقَاء	See you	/ʔila l.liqaːʔ/	ilá al-liqāʼ
مع السلامة	Goodbye	/maʕa s.saˈlaːma/	maʻa as-salāmah
من فضلك	Please	/min ˈfadˤlik/	min faḍlik
لَا أَعْرِفْ	I don't know	/laː ˈʔaʕrif/	lā aʻrif
ذلك	That (one)	/ˈðaːlik/	dhālik
كم؟	How much/How many?	/kam/	kam?
ماذا؟	What?	/maː.ðaː/	mādhā?
نعم	Yes	/na.ʕam/	naʻam
لا	No	/laː/	lā

== See also ==
- Arabic
- Varieties of Arabic
- Teaching Arabic as a Foreign Language
- Arabic literature
- Arab League
- List of countries and territories where Arabic is an official language
- A Dictionary of Modern Written Arabic
- Arabic–English Lexicon
- Diglossia
- Arabic phonology
- Help:IPA/Arabic
- Pluricentric language
