= Teaching Arabic as a foreign language =

Teaching Arabic as a Foreign Language (TAFL) is the academic field concerned with the instruction of Arabic to non-native speakers. It encompasses various methodologies, curriculum design, linguistic theory, and instructional technologies that aim to develop proficiency in different forms of Arabic, including Modern Standard Arabic (MSA), Classical Arabic, and regional dialects.

== Background ==
Arabic is a Semitic language spoken by more than 400 million people across the Middle East and North Africa (MENA) region. As one of the six official languages of the United Nations and the liturgical language of Islam, Arabic holds both political and cultural significance. Interest in learning Arabic has increased in recent decades, driven by factors such as globalization, diplomacy, migration, and the growing need for intercultural communication.

== Varieties of Arabic ==
Arabic exhibits significant diglossia, with a formal register coexisting alongside a range of spoken dialects:

- Modern Standard Arabic (MSA): the standardized form used in media, education, and official discourse.
- Classical Arabic: the language of classical texts, notably the Qur'an and pre-modern literature.
- Colloquial Dialects: regional vernaculars such as Egyptian Arabic, Iraqi Arabic, Levantine Arabic, Maghrebi Arabic, and Gulf Arabic, which differ widely in phonology, vocabulary, and grammar.

== Teaching Approaches ==
Instructional methods in TAFL vary widely and often combine traditional and modern techniques:

- Grammar-Translation Method
- Communicative Language Teaching (CLT)
- Task-Based Language Teaching (TBLT)
- Content-Based Instruction (CBI)

The integration of digital tools—such as learning apps, video conferencing, and multimedia content—has transformed how Arabic is taught and accessed worldwide.

== Institutions and Programs ==
A number of institutions are recognized for their contributions to Arabic language education:

- The American University in Cairo
- Middlebury College (Arabic Summer Language School)
- Jordan Language Academy, in Amman, Jordan
- Qasid Arabic Institute in Amman, Jordan
- SOAS University of London

Additionally, many universities in the Arab world operate specialized centers for teaching Arabic to speakers of other languages.

== Assessment and Proficiency Standards ==
Arabic language learners are assessed using several international frameworks:

- Arabic Language Proficiency Test (ALPT)
- ACTFL Proficiency Guidelines
- Common European Framework of Reference for Languages (CEFR)

== Challenges ==
Students of Arabic often face unique challenges:

- Complex morphology and inflectional patterns
- Right-to-left script and absence of short vowels in writing
- Pharyngeal and emphatic consonants uncommon in many other languages
- Functional divide between formal and colloquial Arabic

Educators continue to adapt instructional strategies to meet these challenges, often incorporating dialect alongside MSA for practical communication.

== See also ==
- Arabic grammar
- Arabic alphabet
- Language education
- Second language acquisition
- Language immersion
