= Pausa =

Hiatus between prosodic units

In linguistics, pausa (Latin for 'break', from Greek παῦσις, pâusis 'stopping, ceasing') is the hiatus between prosodic declination units. The concept is somewhat broad, as it is primarily used to refer to allophones that occur in certain prosodic environments, and these environments vary between languages.

== Characteristics ==
Some sound laws specifically operate only in pausa. For example, certain phonemes may be pronounced differently at the beginning or the end of a word if no other word precedes or follows within the same prosodic unit, such as a word in the citation form. That is the case with the final-obstruent devoicing of German, Turkish, Russian, and other languages whose voiced obstruent consonants are devoiced pre-pausa and before voiceless consonants.

The opposite environment is relevant in Spanish, whose voiced fricatives become stops post-pausa and after nasals. Such environments are often termed pre-pausal and post-pausal, respectively. The phrases in pausa and pausal form are often taken to mean at the end of a prosodic unit, in pre-pausal position, as pre-pausal effects are more common than post-pausal effects.

Very commonly, such allophones are described as occurring "word-initially" or "word-finally", as opposed to other allophones found "word-medially", because that is a more accessible phrasing for most readers. However, that phrasing is accurate only for a word in citation form. It is not always clear in the description of a language whether an alleged word-boundary allophone is actually defined by the word boundary, as opposed to being pausal allophones being defined by prosodic boundaries.

== Examples ==
In English, the last stressed syllable before a pausa receives tonic stress, giving the illusion of a distinction between primary and secondary stress. In dialects of English with linking or intrusive R (a type of liaison), the r is not realized in pausa even if the following word begins in a vowel. Similarly, French liaison does not operate in pausa.

English words that have weak and strong forms are realized as strong after and often also before a pausa.

In some dialects of English, the voiced fricatives devoice when they are in pausa, making the /z/ a [z̥] in "a loud buzz" but remaining a [z] in "a buzz that's loud".

In Arabic, Biblical Hebrew, other Semitic languages, and Egyptian, pausa affects grammatical inflections. In Arabic, short vowels, including those carrying case, are dropped before a pausa, and the gender is modified. The Arabic alphabet has a letter ة (tāʾ marbūṭa تاء مربوطة) for the feminine, which is classically pronounced [h] in pausa but [t] in liaison. In Masoretic Biblical Hebrew, /laχ/ (לָךְ) is the general feminine form of 'to you' but also the pausal masculine form.

In Spanish, voiced fricative/approximants [β̞, ð̞, ɣ̞, ʝ̞] are pronounced as stops [b, d, ɡ, ɟʝ] after a pausa and after a nasal.

In Tuscan, the full infinitive form of the verb occurs only pre-pausa.

In Kombe, a word-final high tone becomes low or downstepped in pausa.

In Mehri, emphatic consonants become ejectives pre-pausa.

In Tapieté, epenthesis of [x] occurs when /ɨ/ is in pausa, while epenthesis of [ʔ] occurs when any other vowel is in pausa. So the word /kɨ/ becomes [kɨx] when it is in pausa, and the word /hẽʔẽ/ becomes [hẽʔẽʔ] when it is in pausa.

== See also ==
- Lemma (morphology), also known as a word's "citation form"
- Ellipsis
- Line break (poetry)
- Prosody (linguistics) § Pause
- Sandhi
