= Levantine Arabic grammar =

Grammar of the Levantine Arabic variety

Levantine Arabic grammar is the set of rules by which Levantine Arabic creates statements, questions and commands. In many respects, it is quite similar to that of the other vernacular Arabic varieties.

== Word order ==
Both VSO (verb before subject before object) and SVO (subject before verb before object) word orders are possible in Levantine Arabic. The verb is before the object (VO). However, Classical Arabic tends to prefer VSO, whereas in Levantine SVO is more common. Subject-initial order indicates topic-prominent sentences, while verb-initial order indicates subject-prominent sentences.

In interrogative sentences, the interrogative particle comes first.

== Copula ==
There is no copula used in the present tense in Levantine. In other tenses, the verb kān (كان) is used. Its present tense form is used in the future tense.

== Definiteness ==
There is no indefinite article in Levantine Arabic. Nouns (except proper nouns) are automatically indefinite by the absence of the definite article.

The Arabic definite article ال (il) precedes the noun or adjective and has multiple pronunciations. Its vowel is dropped when the preceding word ends in a vowel. A helping vowel "e" is inserted if the following word begins with a consonant cluster.

It assimilates with "Sun letters" - any consonant pronounced with the tip of the tongue. Other letters are called "Moon letters". The letter Jeem (ج) is a special case. It is usually a Sun letter for speakers pronouncing it as [ʒ] but not for those pronouncing it as [d͡ʒ].

Definiteness in Levantine: Examples
Moon letter	البيت	il-bēt
Sun letter (assimilation)	الشمس	iš-šams
Letter Jeem (ج)	الجمعة	il-jumʕa [ɪl.ˈd͡ʒʊm.ʕa] / ij-jumʕa [ɪʒ.ˈʒʊm.ʕa]
Consonant cluster	الكتاب	le-ktāb

== Nouns ==
=== Case ===
There is no case marking in Levantine (contrary to Classical Arabic).

=== Gender ===
Nouns can be either masculine or feminine. In the singular, most feminine nouns end with Tāʼ marbūṭah (ـة). This is pronounced as –a or -e depending on the preceding consonant. Generally, -a after guttural (ح خ ع غ ق ه ء) and emphatic consonants (ر ص ض ط ظ), and -e after other consonants.

=== Number ===
Nouns in Levantine can be singular, dual or plural.

The dual is invariably formed with suffix -ēn (ين-). The dual is often used in a non-exact sense, especially in temporal and spatial nouns:

- جمعة, jumʕa, one week
- جمعتين, jumʕatēn, a couple of weeks (lit. 'two weeks')

For nouns referring to humans, the regular (also called sound) masculine plural is formed with the suffix -īn. The regular feminine plural is formed with -āt. The masculine plural is used to refer to a group with both gender. However, there are many broken plurals (also called internal plurals), in which the consonantal root of the singular is changed (nonconcatenative morphology). These plural patterns are shared with other varieties of Arabic and may also be applied to foreign borrowings: such as faːtuːra (plural: fwaːtiːr), from the Italian fattura, invoice. The plural of loanwords may be sound or broken. Several patterns of broken plurals exist and it is not possible to exactly predict them.

Inanimate objects take feminine singular agreement in the plural, for verbs, attached pronouns, and adjectives.

Some foreign words that designate weights and measures such as sαnti (centimeter), šēkel (shekel), and kīlo (kilometer/kilogram) (but not mitr, meter, which behaves like other Arabic nouns) are invariable. The dual form is not used and numbers 3–10 don't lose their final vowel when followed by these nouns:

- šēkel: 1 shekel
- tnēn šēkel: 2 shekels
- talāte šēkel: 3 shekels
- ʕašara šēkel: 10 shekels

The 12 most common broken plural patterns
Pattern (Arabic)	Pattern (Latin)	Example	English meaning
ـَ و ا ـِ ـ	CawāCeC	شارع šāreʕ شوارع šawāreʕ	street streets
أَ ـْ ـ ا ـ	ʔaCCāC	شخص šaḵṣ أشخاص ʾašḵāṣ	person people
ـَ ـ ا ـِ ي ـ	CaCāCīC	دكان dukkān دكاكين dakākīn	convenience store convenience stores
ـُ ـُ و ـ	CuCūC	حرف ḥarf حروف ḥurūf	letter letters
ـُ ـَ ـ	CuCaC	قصة ʾuṣṣa قصص ʾuṣaṣ	story stories
ـِ ـَ ـ	CiCaC	فريق farīq فرق firaq	team teams
ـُ ـَ ـ ا	CuCaCa	مدير mudīr مدرا mudara	manager managers
ـُ ـّ ا ـ	CuC^{2}C^{2}āC	طالب ṭāleb طلاب ṭullāb	student students
أَ ـْ ـِ ـ ة	ʔaCCiCe	جهاز jihāz أجهزة ʾajhize	electrical device electrical devices
ـُ ـُ ـ	CuCoC	مدينة madīne مدن mudon	city cities
ـُ ـْ ـ ا ن	CuCCān	قميص ʾamīṣ قمصان ʾumṣān	dress shirt dress shirts
أَ ـْ ـِ ـ ا ء	ʔaCCiCāʔ	صديق ṣadīq أصدقاء ʾaṣdiqāʾ	friend friends

=== Nominal sentences ===
Phrasal word order is head-dependent:

- Noun-Genitive
- Noun-Adjective
- Noun-Relative clause.

The genitive relationship is formed by putting the nouns next to each other, this construct is called Iḍāfah (lit. 'addition'). The first noun is always indefinite. If an indefinite noun is added to a definite noun, it results in a new definite compound noun.

Besides possessiveness, the Iḍāfah construct can be used to specify or define the first term.

Possession can also be expressed with تبع, taba^{C}, especially for loanwords:

- my dog: kalbi or il-kalb taba^{C}i,
- the neighbors' house: bēt il-jirᾱn or il-bēt taba^{C} il-jirᾱn
- your radio: ir-rᾱdyo taba^{C}kom.

There is no limit to the number of nouns that can be strung together in an Iḍāfah. However, it is rare to have three or more words, except with very common or monosyllabic nouns.

The Iḍāfah construct is different from the noun-adjective structure. In an Iḍāfah construct, the two nouns might be different in terms of their definiteness: the first is indefinite, the second is usually definite. Whereas adjectives always agree with nouns in definiteness.

The first term must be in the construct state: if it ends in the feminine marker (/-ah/, or /-ih/), it changes to (/-at/, /-it/) in pronunciation (i.e. ة pronounced as "t"). Whereas in a noun-adjective string, the pronunciation would remain (/-ah/, /-ih/).

Iḍāfah and noun-adjective examples
Levantine (Arabic)	Levantine (Latin)	English	Note
كتاب إستاذ	ktāb ʾistāz	a book of a/the teacher	Iḍāfah of two indefinite nouns
كتاب الإستاذ	ktāb il-ʾistāz	the book of the teacher	Iḍāfah of indefinite + definite noun
كتاب الإستاذ الجديد	ktāb il-ʾistāz le-jdīd	the new book of the teacher OR the book of the new teacher	The adjective is definite, because the Iḍāfah is definite. Both meanings are possible, to avoid confusion the preposition -la can be used to split the Iḍāfah.
الكتاب الجديد للإستاذ	le-ktāb le-jdīd l-il-ʾistāz	the new book of the teacher	Split Iḍāfah
الكتاب للإستاذ الجديد	le-ktāb l-il-ʾistāz le-jdīd	the book of the new teacher	Split Iḍāfah
الكتاب الجديد تبع الإستاذ	le-ktāb le-jdīd taba^{C} il-ʾistāz	the teacher's new book	Use of تبع, taba^{C} to avoid confusion.
كتاب إستاذ العربي	ktāb ʾistāz il-ʕarabi	the book of the teacher of Arabic	Chained Iḍāfah, only the last noun takes the definite article
مجلة جديدة	majalle jdīde	a new magazine	Noun-adjective: ة pronounced as "ih"
مجلة الإستاذ	majallet il-ʾistāz	the magazine of the teacher	ة pronounced as "t" in construct state
بيت خالد	bēt ḵālid	Khalid's house	With a proper noun: possessiveness
مدينة نيويورك	madīnet nyū-yōrk	New York City	First noun ends with ah (pronounced as "t"), second is a proper noun
مدينة زغيرة	madīne zḡīre	a small town/city	Noun-adjective, ة pronounced as "ah"
صحن حمص	ṣaḥen ḥummuṣ	hummus dish	

=== Verbal nouns ===
Verbal nouns (also called gerunds or masdar) play an important role in Levantine. Derived from a verb root, they can be used as a noun ("food") or as a gerund ("eating"). Verbal nouns do not exist as infinitives, they are not part of the verbal system but of the lexicon.

Verbal nouns declension patterns for the ten verb forms (Note: C represents a consonant, v represent a short vowel, v̄ represents a long vowel. Short vowel variations include e ~ i ~ ǝ and a ~ ǝ.)
Form	Verb pattern	Verbal noun pattern		Example	
Form	Verb pattern	Most common	Variants	Verb	Verbal noun
Form I	C^{1}vC^{2}vC^{3}	C^{1}vC^{2}C^{3}	Many variants	درس daras (to study, to learn)	درس dars (a lesson)
Form II	C^{1}aC^{2}C^{2}aC^{3}	taC^{1}C^{2}īC^{3}	taC^{1}C^{2}iC^{3}a / tiC^{1}C^{2}āC^{3}	قدّم qaddam (to present, to offer)	تقديم taqdīm (a presentation, presenting)
Form III	C^{1}v̄C^{2}aC^{3}	muC^{1}v̄C^{2}aC^{3}a	C^{1}iC^{2}v̄C^{3}	ساعد sāʕad (to help)	مساعدة musāʕada (help, assistance)
Form IV	ʔaC^{1}C^{2}aC^{3}	ʔiC^{1}C^{2}āC^{3}		أقنع ʾaqnaʿ (to convince)	إقناع ʾiqnāʿ (convincing)
Form V	tC^{1}aC^{2}C^{2}aC^{3}	taC^{1}aC^{2}C^{2}uC^{3}		تجنب tjannab (to avoid)	تجنّب tajannub (avoiding, avoidance)
Form VI	tC^{1}v̄C^{2}aC^{3}	taC^{1}v̄C^{2}uC^{3}		تجاهل tjāhal (to ignore)	تجاهل tajāhul (ignoring)
Form VII	nC^{1}aC^{2}aC^{3} (North) inC^{1}aC^{2}aC^{3} (South)	inC^{1}iC^{2}v̄C^{3}		انبسط inbasaṭ (to be happy, to have fun)	انبساط inbisāṭ (happiness)
Form VIII	C^{1}tvC^{2}vC^{3} (North) iC^{1}tvC^{2}vC^{3} (South)	iC^{1}tiC^{2}v̄C^{3}		اقترح iqtaraḥ (to suggest)	اقتراح iqtirāḥ (a suggestion)
Form IX	C^{1}C^{2}aC^{3}C^{3} (North) iC^{1}C^{2}aC^{3}C^{3} (South)	iC^{1}C^{2}iC^{3}āC^{3}		احمر iḥmarr (to blush, to turn red)	احمرار iḥmirār (blushing, turning red)
Form X	staC^{1}C^{2}aC^{3} (North) istaC^{1}C^{2}aC^{3} (South)	istiC^{1}C^{2}āC^{3}		استعمل istaʕmal (to use)	استعمال istiʕmāl (use, usage)

== Numerals ==
=== Cardinal numbers ===
Number one and two have a masculine and feminine form. When used with a noun, they rather follow it like an adjective than precede it for emphasis. An exception are uncountable nouns. When the number 2 is accompanied by a noun, the dual form is usually used: waladēn, 2 boys.

Numbers larger than 3 do not have gender but may have two forms, one used before nouns and one used independently. In particular, numbers between 3 and 10 lose their final vowel before a noun.

Numbers from 3 to 10 are followed by plural nouns. Numbers from 11 to 99 are followed by a singular.

Numbers 100 and onwards follow the same rule as numbers 0–99 based on their last two digits. 100 and 101 are followed by a singular, 102 is followed by a dual (102 books: miyye u-ktābēn), 103–110 by a plural, and 111–199 is like 11–99, followed by a singular.

Before a small set of nouns (e.g. ألف, ʾalf, "thousand") the independent form is used in construct state (ة pronounced as "t"). مية (miyye, "hundred") is always in construct state before nouns.

Levantine cardinal numbers
Number	Gender	Independent	Followed by noun	Number of noun
0 / ٠		صفر ṣifr	—N/a	Plural
1 / ١	m	واحد wāḥad	—N/a	Singular
1 / ١	f	واحدة waḥde	—N/a	Singular
2 / ٢	m	تنين tnēn	—N/a	Dual or plural
2 / ٢	f	تنتين tintēn	—N/a	Dual or plural
3 / ٣		تلاتة talāte (South) تلاتة tlēte (North)	تلت talat/tlat (South) تلات tlēt/tlat (North)	Plural
4 / ٤		أربعة ʾarbaʕa	أربع ʾarbaʕ	Plural
5 / ٥		خمسة ḵamse	خمس ḵams	Plural
6 / ٦		ستة sitte	ست sitt	Plural
7 / ٧		سبعة sabʕa	سبع sabʕ	Plural
8 / ٨		تمانية tamānye (South) تمانة tmēne (North)	تمن taman/tman (South) تمن tman/tmin (North)	Plural
9 / ٩		تسع tisʕa	تسع tisʕ	Plural
10 / ١٠		عشرة ʕašara	عشر ʕašr	Plural
11 / ١١		احدعش (i)ḥdaʕš	احدعشر (i)ḥdaʕšar	Singular
12 / ١٢		تنعش tnaʕš	تنعشر tnaʕšar	Singular
20 / ٢٠		عشرين ʕišrīn		Singular
21 / ٢١		واحد وعشرين wāhad w-ʕišrīn		Singular
30 / ٣٠		تلاتين talatīn (South) / tlētīn (North)		Singular
100 / ١٠٠		مية miyye	مية mīt	Singular
101 / ١٠١		مية وواحد miyye u-wāḥad	مية و- miyye u- + Singular noun	Singular
102 / ١٠٢		مية وتنين miyye u-tnēn	مية و- miyye u- + Dual noun	Dual
103 / ١٠٣		مية وتلاتة miyye u-talāte	مية وتلت miyye u-talat	Plural
200 / ٢٠٠		ميتين mītēn		Singular
300 / ٣٠٠		تلتمية t(a)lat-miyye	تلتمية t(a)lat-mīt	Singular
1000 / ١٠٠٠		ألف ʾalf		Singular
2000 / ٢٠٠٠		ألفين ʾalfēn		Singular
3000 / ٣٠٠٠		تلتة آلاف t(a)latt‿ālāf		Singular
10000 / ١٠٠٠٠		عشرة آلاف ʕašert‿ālāf		Singular
11000 / ١١٠٠٠		إحدشر ألف ʾiḥdaʕšar ʾalf		Singular
100000 / ١٠٠٠٠٠		مية ألف mīt ʾalf		Singular

=== Ordinal numbers and fractions ===
Ordinal numbers can either precede or follow the noun. If they precede the noun the masculine form is used and the definite article is dropped.

Ordinal numbers above 10 do not exist, instead the cardinal numbers are used following the noun.

Ordinal numbers in Levantine
Ordinal number				Fraction		
Number	Masculine or followed by noun	Feminine	Plural	Number	Singular	Plural
1 / ١	أول ʾawwal	أولى ʾūla	أوائل ʾawāʾel or أولى ʾuwala	—N/a		
2 / ٢	تاني tāni	تانية tānye	تانين tānyīn	1/2 / ١/٢	نص nuṣṣ	أنصاص (ʾa)nṣāṣ
3 / ٣	تالت tālet	تالتة tālte	تالتين tāltīn	1/3 / ١/٣	تلت tult	تلات tlāt
4 / ٤	رابع rābeʕ	رابعة rābʕa	رابعين rābʕīn	1/4 / ١/٤	ربع rubʕ	رباع rbāʕ
5 / ٥	خامس ḵāmes	خامسة ḵāmse	خامسين ḵāmsīn	1/5 / ١/٥	خمس ḵums	أخماس (ʾa)ḵmās
6 / ٦	سادس sādes	سادسة sādse	سادسين sādsīn	1/6 / ١/٦	سدس suds	أسداس (ʾa)sdās
7 / ٧	سابع sābeʕ	سابعة sābʕa	سابعين sābʕīn	1/7 / ١/٧	سبع subʕ	أسباع (ʾa)sbāʕ
8 / ٨	تامن tāmen	تامنة tāmne	تامنين tāmnīn	1/8 / ١/٨	تمن tumn	أتمان (ʾa)tmān
9 / ٩	تاسع tāseʕ	تاسعة tāsʕa	تاسعين tāsʕīn	1/9 / ١/٩	تسع tusʕ	أتساع (ʾa)tsāʕ
10 / ١٠	عاشر ʕāšer	عاشرة ʕāšra	عاشرين ʕāšrīn	1/10 / ١/١٠	عشر ʕušr	أشار (ʾa)ʕšār

== Adjectives ==
=== Form ===
Many adjectives have the pattern فعيل (fʕīl / CCīC or faʕīl / CaCīC) but other patterns are also possible.

Adjectives derived from nouns by the suffix ـي (-i) are called Nisba adjectives. Their feminine form ends in ـية (-iyye) and the plural in ـيين (-iyyīn).

=== Gender ===
Adjectives typically have three form: a masculine singular, a feminine singular, and a plural which does not distinguish gender. In most adjectives the feminine is formed through addition of -a/e, sometimes dropping an unstressed short vowel.

=== Number ===
Nouns in dual have adjectives in plural.

The plural of adjectives is either regular ending in ـين (-īn) or is an irregular "broken" plural. It is used with nouns referring to people. For non-human / inanimate / abstract nouns, adjectives can use either the plural or the singular feminine form regardless of the noun's gender.

=== Word order ===
Adjectives follow the noun they modify and agree with it in definiteness. Adjectives without an article after a definite noun express a clause with the invisible copula "to be".

Examples
بيت كبير bēt kbīr	a big house
البيت الكبير il-bēt le-kbīr	the big house
البيت كبير il-bēt kbīr	the house is big

There is no dominant order for degree words and adjectives: Adverbs of degree like كتير (ktīr, "very") and شوي (šwayy, "a little / a bit") can either precede or follow the adjective.

=== Superlative and comparative ===
There are no separate comparative and superlative forms but the elative is used in both cases.

The elative is formed by adding a hamza at the beginning of the adjective and replace the vowels by "a" (pattern: أفعل ʾafʕal / aCCaC). Adjective endings in ي (i) and و (u) are changed into ی (a). If the second and third consonant in the root are the same, they are geminated (pattern: أفلّ ʾafall / ʾaCaCC).

Speakers who pronounce ق as hamza might pronounced the elative prefix as "h" in order to avoid two consecutive hamzas.

Examples of elative adjectives
	Adjective	Elative
Regular	كبير kbīr	أكبر ʾakbar
Regular	سهل sahl	أسهل ʾashal
Regular	قديم ʾadīm	أقدم ʾaʾdam / haʾdam
Gemination	جديد jdīd	أجدّ ʾajadd
Gemination	قليل ʾalīl	أقلّ ʾaʾall / haʾall
Final i/u	عالي ʕāli	أعلى ʾaʕla
Final i/u	حلو ḥilu	أحلى ʾaḥla
Irregular	منيح mnīḥ / كويس kwayyes	أحسن 'aḥsan (from حسن ḥasan)

When an elative modifies a noun, it precedes the noun and no definite article is used.

In order to compare two things, the word من (min, lit. 'from') is used in the sense of "than" in English.

Examples of elative sentences
Levantine (Arabic)	Levantine (Latin)	English
أحسن إشي	ʾaḥsan ʾiši	the best thing
هالإشي أحسن	ha-l-ʾiši ʾaḥsan	this thing is better / the best
هالإشي أحسن من إشي تاني	ha-l-ʾiši ʾaḥsan min ʾiši tāni	this thing is better than something else

Not all adjectives can form an elative, especially those that are participles or derived from nouns. In this case, أكتر (ʾaktar, "more, most") is used.

Examples of comparative and superlative using أكتر (ʾaktar, "more, most")
Levantine (Arabic)	Levantine (Latin)	English
مجنون	majnūn	crazy
مجنون أكتر	majnūn ʾaktar	crazier / craziest
هو مجنون أكتر منك	huwwe majnūn ʾaktar minnak	he is crazier than you
أكتر واحد مجنون	ʾaktar wāḥad majnūn	the craziest one

== Prepositions ==
Prepositions must precede nominals in Levantine.

Common prepositions
Levantine	English
بـ bi-	with; in, at
فِي fī	in, at
مَعَ maʕ	with, along with
مِن min	from; than
لـ la-	to; for
عـ ʕa- / على ʕāla	on, upon; to; about
قبل ʾabl	before
بعد baʕd	after
قدّام ʾuddām	in front of
ورا wara	behind
فوق fōʾ	above, over
تحت taḥt	below, under
بين bēn	between

== Pronouns ==
Feminine plural forms modifying human females are found mostly in rural and Bedouin areas. They are not mentioned below.

=== Personal pronouns ===
Levantine has eight persons, and therefore eight pronouns. Dual forms that exist in Modern Standard Arabic do not exist in Levantine, the plural is used instead. Because conjugated verbs indicate the subject with a prefix and/or a suffix, independent subject pronouns are usually not necessary and are mainly used for emphasis.

==== Independent personal pronouns ====
Levantine independent personal pronouns
		Singular	Plural
1st person (m/f)		أنا ʾana	احنا ʾiḥna (South) / نحنا niḥna (North)
2nd person	m	انت ʾinta	انتو / انتوا ʾintu
2nd person	f	انتي ʾinti	انتو / انتوا ʾintu
3rd person	m	هو huwwe	هم humme (South) / هن hinne (North)
3rd person	f	هي hiyye	هم humme (South) / هن hinne (North)

==== Direct object and possessive pronouns ====
Direct object pronouns are indicated by suffixes attached to the conjugated verb. Their form depends whether the verb ends with a consonant or a vowel. Suffixed to nouns, these pronouns express possessive.

Levantine enclitic pronouns, direct object and possessive
		Singular		Plural
		after consonant	after vowel	Plural
1st person	after verb	ـني -ni		ـنا -na
1st person	else	ـِي -i	ـي -y	ـنا -na
2nd person	m	ـَك -ak	ـك -k	ـكُن -kun (North) ـكُم -kom ـكو -ku (South)
2nd person	f	ـِك -ik	ـكِ -ki	ـكُن -kun (North) ـكُم -kom ـكو -ku (South)
3rd person	m	و -u (North) ـُه -o (South)	ـه (silent) (Note: The accent moves to the last vowel.)	ـُن -(h/w/y)un (North) ـهُم -hom (South)
3rd person	f	ـا -a (North) ـها -ha (South)	ـا -(h/w/y)a (North) ـها -ha (South)	ـُن -(h/w/y)un (North) ـهُم -hom (South)

If a pronoun is already attached on the end of a word, the second pronoun is attached to يا yā (after a vowel) / iyā- (after a consonant), for instance: بدي ياك beddi yaak (I want you (m)).

==== Indirect object pronouns ====
Indirect object pronouns (dative) are suffixed to the conjugated verb. They are form by adding an ل (-l) and then the possessive suffix to the verb. They precede object pronouns if present:

- jāb il-jarīde la-ʔabūy: he brought the newspaper to my father,
- jāb-ha la-ʔabūy: he brought it to my father,
- jab-lo il-jarīde: he brought him the newspaper,
- jab-lo yyā-ha: he brought him it.

Levantine indirect object pronoun suffixes
		Singular	Plural
1st person (m/f)		ـلي -li	ـلنا -lna
2nd person	m	لَك -lak	ـلكُن -lkun (North) ـلكُم -lkom, ـلكو -lku (South)
2nd person	f	ـِلك -lik	ـلكُن -lkun (North) ـلكُم -lkom, ـلكو -lku (South)
3rd person	m	لو -lu (North) لُه -lo (South)	ـلُن -lun (North) ـلهُم -lhom (South)
3rd person	f	ـلا -la (North) ـلها -lha (South)	ـلُن -lun (North) ـلهُم -lhom (South)

=== Demonstrative pronouns ===
Demonstrative pronouns have three referential types: immediate, proximal, and distal. The distinction between proximal and distal demonstratives is of physical, temporal, or metaphorical distance. The genderless and numberless immediate demonstrative article ها ha is translated by "this/the", to designate something immediately visible or accessible.

Levantine demonstrative pronouns
		Singular	Plural
Proximal (this, these)	m	هادا hāda / هاد hād (South, Syria) هيدا hayda (Lebanon)	هدول hadōl (South, Syria) هيدول haydōl / هودي hawdi (Lebanon)
Proximal (this, these)	f	هادي hādi / هاي hāy (South) هيّ hayy (Syria) هيدي haydi (Lebanon)	هدول hadōl (South, Syria) هيدول haydōl / هودي hawdi (Lebanon)
Distal (that, those)	m	هداك hadāk (South, Syria) هيداك haydāk (Lebanon)	هدولاك hadōlāk (South) هدوليك hadōlīk (Syria) هيدوليك haydōlīk (Lebanon)
Distal (that, those)	f	هديك hadīk (South, Syria) هيديك haydīk (Lebanon)	هدولاك hadōlāk (South) هدوليك hadōlīk (Syria) هيدوليك haydōlīk (Lebanon)

=== Interrogative pronouns ===
Interrogative pronouns in Levantine
Levantine	English
مين mīn	who
لمين la-mīn	whose
شو šū / إيش ʾēš (South)	what
لشو la-šu	for what
ليش lēš / ليه lē (Lebanon)	why
أيّ ʾayy	which
إيمتى ʾēmta / إمتى ʾimta (Lebanon)	when
وين wēn	where
لوين la-wēn	where to
من وين min wēn / منين mnēn	where from
كيف kīf / شلون šlōn (Syria)	how
قدّيش ʾaddēš / قدّيه ʾaddē (Lebanon)	how much
كم kam	how many
كل قدّيش kull/kill ʾaddēš / كم مرّة kam marra	how often

=== Relative pronouns ===
The relative pronoun, invariable for number and gender, is اللي (illi).

== Verbs ==
=== Root ===
Like Arabic verbs, most Levantine verbs are based on a triliteral root (also called radical) made of three consonants (therefore also called triconsonantal root). The set of consonants communicates the basic meaning of a verb, e.g. k-t-b 'write', q-r-’ 'read', ’-k-l 'eat'. Changes to the vowels in between the consonants, along with prefixes or suffixes, specify grammatical functions such as tense, person and number, in addition to changes in the meaning of the verb that embody grammatical concepts such as mood (e.g. indicative, subjunctive, imperative), voice (active or passive), and functions such as causative, intensive, or reflexive.

Quadriliteral roots are less common, but often used to coin new vocabulary or to Arabicize foreign words.

The base form is the third-person masculine singular of the perfect (also called past) tense.

=== Verb forms ===
Almost all Levantine verbs can be categorized in one of ten verb forms (also called verb measures, stems, patterns, or types). Form I, the most common one, serves as a base for the other nine forms. Each form carries a different verbal idea, relative to the meaning of its root. Technically, 10 verbs can be constructed from any given triconsonantal root. However, all of those ten forms may not be used in practice by speakers. After Form I, Forms II, V, VII, and X are the most common ones.

Sound verb forms in Levantine
Form/measure/stem	Tendency of meaning	Perfect pattern	Imperfect pattern	Example	Root of the example	Note
Form I	Active or stative verb (base form)	C^{1}vC^{2}vC^{3}	-C^{1}vC^{2}vC^{3}	عمل ʕimil (to do, to make)	ع م ل ʕ-m-l (related to work)	—N/a
Form II	Causes action (causative), shows intensity (augmentative), or may indicate continuing action	C^{1}aC^{2}C^{2}aC^{3}	-C^{1}aC^{2}C^{2}eC^{3}	علّم ʕallam (to teach)	ع ل م ʕ-l-m (related to knowledge)	Most productive form
Form III	Active in meaning or shows attempt; focus is on one-sided action	C^{1}v̄C^{2}aC^{3}	-C^{1}v̄C^{2}eC^{3}	عامل ʕāmal (to treat)	ع م ل ʕ-m-l (related to work)	—N/a
Form IV	Causes action, similar to Form II	ʔaC^{1}C^{2}aC^{3}	-C^{1}C^{2}eC^{3}	أعلن ʔaʕlan (to announce)	ع ل ن ʔ-l-n (related to publicity)	Rare, limited to borrowings from MSA
Form V	Reflexive/passive/mediopassive meaning for transitive Form II verbs	tC^{1}aC^{2}C^{2}aC^{3}	-tC^{1}aC^{2}C^{2}aC^{3}	تعلّم tʕallam (to learn)	ع ل م ʕ-l-m (related to knowledge)	Usually intransitive
Form VI	Reflexive/passive meaning for Form III or active in meaning	tC^{1}v̄C^{2}aC^{3}	-tC^{1}v̄C^{2}eC^{3}	تعامل tʕāmal (to work or deal with)	ع م ل ʕ-m-l (related to work)	Usually intransitive
Form VII	Reflexive/passive meaning for Form I or no particular tendency of meaning	nC^{1}aC^{2}aC^{3} (North) inC^{1}aC^{2}aC^{3} (South)	-nC^{1}ǝC^{2}eC^{3} -nC^{1}aːC^{2} in medial glide roots	انبسط inbasaṭ (to have fun, enjoy oneself)	ب س ط b-s-ṭ (related to spreading and extending)	—N/a
Form VIII	Active, reflexive, or passive in meaning	C^{1}tvC^{2}vC^{3} (North) iC^{1}tvC^{2}vC^{3} (South)	-C^{1}tvC^{2}vC^{3}	اعترف iʕtaraf (to confess)	ع ر ف ʕ-r-f (related to awareness)	Not productive
Form IX	Inchoative verbs from adjectives: changing of color or physical handicap	C^{1}C^{2}aC^{3}C^{3} (North) iC^{1}C^{2}aC^{3}C^{3} (South)	-C^{1}C^{2}aC^{3}C^{3}	اِبْيَضَّ ibyaḍḍa (to become white)	ب ي ض b-y-ḍ (related to whiteness)	Very rare, replaced by ṣār "to become" + adjective
Form X	Sought to do something or believe something to be big, close, etc. (denominal or deadjectival)	staC^{1}C^{2}aC^{3} (North) istaC^{1}C^{2}aC^{3} (South)	-staC^{1}C^{2}eC^{3}	استعمل istaʕmal (to use)	ع م ل ʕ-m-l (related to work)	Often transitive verbs

Aldrich also defines verb forms XI (for verbs based on quadriliteral roots) and XII (for passive or intransitive version of form XI verbs).

In addition to its form, each verb has a "quality":

- Sound (or regular): 3 distinct radicals, neither the second nor the third is w or y,
- Verbs containing the radicals w or y are called weak. They can be either:
  - Hollow: verbs with w or y as the second radical, which can become a long a in some forms, or
  - Defective: verbs with w or y as the third radical, treated as a vowel,
- Geminate (or doubled): the second and third radicals are identical, remaining together as a double consonant.

Some irregular verbs do not fit into any of the verb forms.

The initial i in verb forms VII, VIII, IX, X drops when the preceding word ends in a vowel or at the beginning of a sentence.

=== Regular verb conjugation ===
The Levantine verb has only two tenses: past (perfect) and present (also called imperfect, b-imperfect, or bi-imperfect). The future tense is an extension of the present tense. The negative imperative is the same as the negative present with helping verb (imperfect). The grammatical person and number as well as the mood are designated by a variety of prefixes and suffixes. The following table shows the paradigm of a sound Form I verb, katab (كتب) 'to write'.

The b-imperfect is usually used for the indicative mood (non-past present, habitual/general present, narrative present, planned future actions, or potential). The prefix b- is deleted in the subjunctive mood, usually after various modal verbs, auxiliary verbs, pseudo-verbs, prepositions, and particles.

In the following table, the accented vowel is in bold.

Conjugation of كتب, 'to write' (sound form I verb)
		North Levantine			South Levantine		
		1st person	2nd person	3rd person	1st person	2nd person	3rd person
Past (Note: Also called perfect.)	Masc.	كتبت kat**a**bit	كتبت kat**a**bit	كتب k**a**tab	كتبت kat**a**bt	كتبت kat**a**bt	كتب k**a**tab
Past	Fem.	كتبت kat**a**bit	كتبتي kat**a**bti	كتبت k**a**tabit	كتبت kat**a**bt	كتبتي kat**a**bti	كتبت k**a**tbat
Past	Plural	كتبنا kat**a**bna	كتبتو kat**a**btu	كتبو k**a**tabu	كتبنا kat**a**bna	كتبتو kat**a**btu	كتبو k**a**tabu
Present (Note: Also called bi-imperfect, b-imperfect, or standard imperfect.)	Masc.	بكتب b**i**ktub	بتكتب bt**i**ktub	بيكتب by**i**ktub	بكتب b**a**ktob	بتكتب bt**u**ktob	بكتب b**u**ktob
Present	Fem.	بكتب b**i**ktub	بتكتبي bt**i**ktbi	بتكتب bt**i**ktub	بكتب b**a**ktob	بتكتبي bt**u**ktobi	بتكتب bt**u**ktob
Present	Plural	منكتب mn**i**ktub	بتكتبو bt**i**ktbu	بيكتبو by**i**ktbu	منكتب mn**u**ktob بنكتب bn**u**ktob (Note: The mn- form is the most common one. However, the bn- form is used in some parts of Palestine such as Jerusalem.)	بتكتبو bt**u**ktobu	بكتبو b**u**ktobu
Present with helping verb (Note: Also called Ø-imperfect, imperfect, or subjunctive.)	Masc.	اكتب **i**ktub	تكتب t**i**ktub	يكتب y**i**ktub	أكتب ʾ**a**ktob	تكتب t**u**ktob	يكتب y**u**ktob
Present with helping verb	Fem.	اكتب **i**ktub	تكتبي t**i**ktbi	تكتب t**i**ktub	أكتب ʾ**a**ktob	تكتبي t**u**ktobi	تكتب t**u**ktob
Present with helping verb	Plural	نكتب n**i**ktub	تكتبو t**i**ktbu	يكتبو y**i**ktbu	نكتب n**u**ktob	تكتبو t**u**ktobu	يكتبو y**u**ktobu
Positive imperative (Note: Also called imperative or command.)	Masc.	—N/a	كتوب kt**ū**b	—N/a	—N/a	أكتب ʾ**u**ktob	—N/a
Positive imperative	Fem.	—N/a	كتبي kt**i**bi	—N/a	—N/a	أكتب ʾ**u**ktobi	—N/a
Positive imperative	Plural	—N/a	كتبو kt**i**bu	—N/a	—N/a	أكتب ʾ**u**ktobu	—N/a
Active participle (Note: Also called present participle. Not all active participles are used and their meaning may vary.)	Masc.	كاتب k**ē**tib			كاتب k**ā**teb		
Active participle	Fem.	كاتبة k**ē**tbi			كاتبة k**ā**tbe		
Active participle	Plural	كاتبين kētb**ī**n			كاتبين kātb**ī**n		
Passive participle (Note: Also called past participle, mostly used as an adjective. Not all passive participles are used and their meaning may vary.)	Masc.	مكتوب makt**ū**b			مكتوب makt**ū**b		
Passive participle	Fem.	مكتوبة makt**ū**ba			مكتوبة makt**ū**ba		
Passive participle	Plural	مكتوبين maktūb**ī**n			مكتوبين maktūb**ī**n		

Table of prefixes, affixes, and suffixes added to the base form (for sound form I verbs with stressed prefixes)
		Singular			Dual/Plural		
		1st person	2nd person	3rd person	1st person	2nd person	3rd person
Past	M	-it	-it	∅ (base form)	-na	-tu	-u
Past	F	-it	-ti	-it (North) -at (South)	-na	-tu	-u
Present	M	bi- (North) ba- (South)	bti-	byi- (North) bi- (South)	mni-	bti- -u	byi- -u (North) bi- -u (South)
Present	F	bi- (North) ba- (South)	bti- -i	bti-	mni-	bti- -u	byi- -u (North) bi- -u (South)
Present with helping verb	M	i- (North) a- (South)	ti-	yi-	ni-	ti- -u	yi- -u
Present with helping verb	F	i- (North) a- (South)	ti- -i	ti-	ni-	ti- -u	yi- -u
Positive imperative	M	—N/a	∅ (Lengthening the present tense vowel, North) i- (Subjunctive without initial consonant, South)	—N/a	—N/a	-u (Stressed vowel u becomes i, North) i- -u (South)	—N/a
Positive imperative	F	—N/a	-i (Stressed vowel u becomes i, North) i- -i (South)	—N/a	—N/a	-u (Stressed vowel u becomes i, North) i- -u (South)	—N/a
Active participle	M	-ē- (North) or -ā- (South) after the first consonant			-īn (added to the masculine form)		
Active participle	F	-e/i or -a (added to the masculine form)			-īn (added to the masculine form)		
Passive participle	M	ma- and -ū- after the second consonant			-īn (added to the masculine form)		
Passive participle	F	-a (added to the masculine form)			-īn (added to the masculine form)		

In the perfect tense, the first person singular and second person masculine singular are identical. For regular verbs, the third-person feminine singular is written identically but stressed differently.

Depending on regions and accents, the -u can be pronounced -o and the -i can be pronounced -é.

In Southern Levantine dialects, the vowel of the suffix in past tense 3rd person feminine as well as the prefix in the present tense 1st person singular is "a" instead of "i". It might be "u" in other persons of the present tense due to vowel harmony.

=== Active participle ===
The active participle, also called present participle, is grammatically an adjective derived from a verb. Depending on the context, it can express the present or present continuous (with verbs of motion, location, or mental state), the near future, or the present perfect (past action with a present result). It can also serve as a noun or an adjective.

The active participle can be inflected from the verb based on its verb form.

Active participle declension patterns for the ten verb forms
Form	Verb pattern	Active participle pattern	Example	
Form	Verb pattern	Active participle pattern	Verb	Active participle
Form I	C^{1}vC^{2}vC^{3}	C^{1}v̄C^{2}vC^{3}	مسك masak (to grab, to arrest)	ماسك mɑ̄sik (is arresting, has arrested)
Form II	C^{1}aC^{2}C^{2}aC^{3}	mC^{1}aC^{2}C^{2}eC^{3}	قدّم qaddam (to present, to offer)	مقدّم mqaddem (has presented, a presenter)
Form III	C^{1}v̄C^{2}aC^{3}	mC^{1}v̄C^{2}iC^{3}	ساعد sāʕad (to help)	مساعد msāʕid (assistant, has helped)
Form IV	ʔaC^{1}C^{2}aC^{3}	miC^{1}C^{2}iC^{3}	أقنع ʾaqnaʿ (to convince)	مقنع miqniʿ (is convincing, has convinced)
Form V	tC^{1}aC^{2}C^{2}aC^{3}	mitC^{1}aC^{2}C^{2}eC^{3}	تجنب tjannab (to avoid)	متجنب mitjanneb (is avoiding)
Form VI	tC^{1}v̄C^{2}aC^{3}	mitC^{1}v̄C^{2}aC^{3}	تجاهل tjāhal (to ignore)	متجاهل mitjāhal (is ignoring)
Form VII	nC^{1}aC^{2}aC^{3} (North) inC^{1}aC^{2}aC^{3} (South)	minC^{1}aC^{2}eC^{3}	انبسط inbasaṭ (to be happy, to have fun)	منبسط minbasiṭ (is happy)
Form VIII	C^{1}tvC^{2}vC^{3} (North) iC^{1}tvC^{2}vC^{3} (South)	minC^{1}tvC^{2}vC^{3}	اقترح iqtaraḥ (to suggest)	مقترح miqtariḥ (has suggested)
Form IX	C^{1}C^{2}aC^{3}C^{3} (North) iC^{1}C^{2}aC^{3}C^{3} (South)	miC^{1}C^{2}aC^{3}C^{3}	احمر iḥmarr (to blush, to turn red)	محمر miḥmarr (is blushing, has turned red)
Form X	staC^{1}C^{2}aC^{3} (North) istaC^{1}C^{2}aC^{3} (South)	mistaC^{1}C^{2}iC^{3}	استعمل istaʕmal (to use)	مستعمل imstaʕmil (user, has used)

=== Passive participle ===
The passive participle, also called past participle, has a similar meaning as in English (i.e. sent, written, etc.). It is mostly used as an adjective but it can sometimes be used as a noun. It is inflected from the verb based on its verb form. However, in practice, passive participles are largely limited to verb forms I (CvCvC) and II (CvCCvC), becoming maCCūC for the former and mCaCCaC for the latter.

Passive participle declension patterns
Form	Verb pattern	Passive participle pattern	Example	
Form	Verb pattern	Passive participle pattern	Verb	Passive participle
Form I	C^{1}vC^{2}vC^{3}	maC^{1}C^{2}ūC^{3}	فتح fataḥ (to open)	مفتوح maftūḥ (opened)
Form II	C^{1}aC^{2}C^{2}aC^{3}	mC^{1}aC^{2}C^{2}aC^{3}	رتب rattab (to organize, to tidy up)	مرتب mrattab (organized, neat)
Form III	C^{1}v̄C^{2}aC^{3}	muC^{1}v̄C^{2}eC^{3}	فاجأ fājaʔ (to surprise)	مفاجِئ mufājaʔ (surprised)
Form IV	ʔaC^{1}C^{2}aC^{3}	muC^{1}C^{2}eC^{3}	أعطى ʔaʕṭa (to give)	معطى muʕṭa (given)
Form V	tC^{1}aC^{2}C^{2}aC^{3}	Very rarely used		
Form VI	tC^{1}v̄C^{2}aC^{3}	Very rarely used		
Form VII	nC^{1}aC^{2}aC^{3} (North) inC^{1}aC^{2}aC^{3} (South)	Not used		
Form VIII	C^{1}tvC^{2}vC^{3} (North) iC^{1}tvC^{2}vC^{3} (South)	muC^{1}tvC^{2}vC^{3}	اقترح iqtaraḥ (to suggest)	مقترح muqtaraḥ (suggested)
Form IX	C^{1}C^{2}aC^{3}C^{3} (North) iC^{1}C^{2}aC^{3}C^{3} (South)	Not used		
Form X	staC^{1}C^{2}aC^{3} (North) istaC^{1}C^{2}aC^{3} (South)	mustaC^{1}C^{2}eC^{3}	استعمل istaʕmal (to use)	مستعمل mustaʕmel (used)

=== Future ===
There are various ways to express the future. One is by using the present tense (with b- prefix) on its own. Another one is by using بد (bidd-, lit. 'want').

The future tense is formed with the imperfect preceded by the particle رح (raḥ) or by the prefixed particle حـ (ḥa-).

Expressing the future: examples
Way	Levantine (Arabic)	Levantine (Latin)	English
Present tense	بروح معك.	barūḥ maʕek.	I'll go with you.
bidd- (to want)	بدي أمرق لعنده بكرة.	biddi ʾamroʾ la-ʕindo bukra.	I'm going to go to his house tomorrow.
Future tense	رح شوفك بكرة.	raḥ šūfak bukra.	I'll see you tomorrow.
Future tense	حشوفك بكرة.	ḥa-šūfak bukra.	I'll see you tomorrow.

=== Present continuous ===
The present continuous is formed with the progressive particle عم (ʕam) followed by the imperfect, with or without the initial b/m depending on the speaker.

Examples of the present continuous
Without b-/m- prefix		With b-/m- prefix		English
Levantine (Arabic)	Levantine (Latin)	Levantine (Arabic)	Levantine (Latin)	English
شو عم تعمل؟	šū ʕam tiʕmel?	شو عم بتعمل؟	šū ʕam(ma) btiʕmel?	What are you doing?
عم أشرب قهوة.	ʕam ʾašrab ʾahwe.	عم بشرب قهوة.	ʕam bašrab ʾahwe.	I'm drinking coffee.

It is also common to use the b- prefix only in those forms starting with a vowel (e.g. 1st person singular).

Mixed usage (b- prefix before vowels)
Levantine (Arabic)	Levantine (Latin)	English
عم بعمل	ʕam baʕmel	I'm doing
عم تعمل	ʕam tiʕmel	you're doing / she's doing
عم بعمل / عم يعمل	ʕam biʕmel / ʕam yiʕmel	he's doing

=== Helping verbs ===
After helping verbs (may also be called modal verbs, pseudo-verbs, auxiliary verbs, or prepositional phrases) the imperfect form (also called subjunctive) is used, that is, the form without the initial b/m.

Common components followed by the subjunctive
Levantine	English
بد bidd- / badd-	to want
ممكن mumkin, قدر qider	can
قدر qider / فيـ fī- (North) / ḥəsen	to be able to
لازم lazim	must, it is necessary to
حب ḥabb	to like
بلكي balki / بركي berki	may
ممنوع mamnūʿ	it's forbidden to
مفروض mafrūḍ / المفروض il-mafrūḍ	should
صار ṣār	to start to, to got used to doing
بلش ballaš	to begin to
فضل fiḍel / bəʾi	to end up
ضل ḍall / تم tamm	to keep doing
رجع rijeʕ	to start doing again
كان kān	used to doing

=== Compound tenses ===
The verb كان (kān) can be followed by another verb, forming compound tenses. Both verbs are conjugated with their subject.

Compound tenses with the example of the verb ʕimil (to do)
	kān in the past tense		kān in the present tense	
Followed by	Levantine	English	Levantine	English
Past tense	كان عمل kān ʕimel	he had done	بكون عمل bikūn ʕimel	he will have done
Active participle	كان عامل kān ʕāmel	he had done	بكون عامل bikūn ʕāmel	he will have done
Subjunctive	كان يعمل kān yiʕmel	he used to do / he was doing	بكون يعمل bikūn yiʕmel	he will be doing
Progressive	كان عم يعمل kān ʕam yiʕmel	he was doing	بكون عم يعمل bikūn ʕam yiʕmel	he will be doing
Future tense	كان رح يعمل kān raḥ yiʕmel كان حيعمل kān ḥa-yiʕmel	he was going to do	—N/a	
Present tense	كان بعمل kān biʕmel	he would do	—N/a	

=== Passive voice ===
Form I verbs often correspond to an equivalent passive form VII verb, with the prefix n-. Form II and form III verbs usually correspond to an equivalent passive on forms V and VI, respectively, with the prefix t-.

Examples of passive forms
Active			Passive		
Verb form	Levantine	English	Verb form	Levantine	English
I	مسك masak	to catch	VII	انمسك inmasak	to be caught
II	غيّر ḡayyar	to change	V	تغيّر tḡayyar	to be changed
III	فاجأ fājaʾ	to surprise	VI	تفاجأ tfājaʾ	to be surprised

While the verb forms V, VI and VII are common in the simple past and compound tenses, the passive participle (past participle) is preferred in the present tense.

Examples of the passive voice
Levantine (Arabic)	Levantine (Latin)	English	Verb form	Tense
الكتاب مكتوب.	le-ktāb maktūb	The book is written.	I	passive participle
الكتاب عم بنكتب.	le-ktāb ʕam binkateb	The book is being written.	VII	progressive
الكتاب انكتب.	le-ktāb inkatab	The book has been written. / The book was written.	VII	past tense
الكتاب كان مكتوب.	le-ktāb kān maktūb	The book was written.	I	kān + passive participle
الكتاب رح ينكتب.	le-ktāb raḥ yinkateb	The book will be written.	VII	future

=== To have ===
Levantine does not have a verb "to have". Instead, possession is expressed using the prepositions عند (ʕind, lit. 'at', meaning "to possess") and مع (maʕ, lit. 'with', meaning "to have on oneself"), followed by personal pronoun suffixes. The past indicator ken and the future indicator raH are used to express possession in the past or the future, respectively.

Inflected forms of عند (ʕind, "at", "to possess, to have")
Base form			عند ʕind
Personal-pronoun- including forms	singular		plural
Personal-pronoun- including forms	m	f	plural
1st person	عندي ʕ**i**ndi		عنّا ʕ**i**nna
2nd person	عندك ʕ**i**ndak	عندك ʕ**i**ndek	عندكم ʕ**i**ndkom (South) / عندكن ʕ**i**ndkun (North)
3rd person	عنده ʕ**i**ndo (South) / عندو ʕ**i**ndu (North)	عندها ʕ**i**ndha (South) / عندا ʕ**i**nda (North)	عندهم ʕ**i**ndhom (South) / عندن ʕ**i**ndun (North)

Inflected forms of مع (maʕ, "with", "to have on oneself")
Base form			مع maʕ
Personal-pronoun- including forms	singular		plural
Personal-pronoun- including forms	m	f	plural
1st person	معي maʕi		معنا maʕna
2nd person	معك maʕak	معك maʕek	معكم maʕkom (South) / معكن maʕkun (North)
3rd person	معه maʕo (South) / معو maʕu (North)	معها maʕha (South) / معا maʕa (North)	معهم maʕhom (South) / معن maʕun (North)

=== To want ===
Enclitic personal pronouns are suffixed directly to the pseudo-verb بدّ (North: badd- / South: bidd-) to express "to want".

Examples of bidd-
Levantine (Arabic)	Levantine (Latin)	English
بدها تشرب قهوة.	bidha tišrab ʾahwe.	She wants to drink coffee.
ما بدي ياه.	mā biddi yyā.	I don't want it.

== Adverbs ==
Levant does not distinguish between adverbs and adjectives in adverbial function. Almost any adjective can be used as an adverb: منيح (mnīḥ, ‘good’) vs. نمتي منيح؟ (nimti mnīḥ, ‘Did you sleep well?’) Adverbs from MSA, showing the suffix -an, are often used, e.g. أبدا (ʾabadan, ‘at all’). Adverbs often appear after the verb or the adjective. كتير (ktīr, ‘very’) can be positioned after or before the adjective.

Adverbs of manner can usually be formed using bi- followed by the nominal form: بسرعة (b-sirʿa, ‘fast, quickly’, lit. 'with speed').

Common adverbs
Levantine	English
إيمتى ʾēmta	when (interrogative)
اليوم il-yōm	today
بكرة bukra	tomorrow
بعد بكرة baʕd bukra	the day after tomorrow
مبارح mbāreḥ	yesterday
أول مبارح ʾawwal mbāriḥ / قبل مبارح ʾabl mbāreḥ	the day before yesterday
هلا halla(ʾ) (common Levantine) / هسا hassa (Amman) / هلقيت halʾēt (Jerusalem)	now
بكير bakkīr	early
بعدين baʕdēn	afterwards
على بكرة ʕala bukra	early in the morning
وقتها waʾt-ha	at that time
الصبح iṣ-ṣubḥ	in the morning or this morning
دايما dāyman / على طول ʕala ṭūl (Damascus)	always
لسا lissa / بعد baʕd (Beirut)	still / not yet
هون hōn	here
هناك hunāk (Amman) / هونيك honīk (Beirut) / هنيك hnīk (Damascus)	there
هيك hēk	like this
على مهل ʕala mahl / شوي شوي šway šway / بهدوء bi-hudūʾ	slowly
كتير ktīr	very
عالآخر ʕa-lʾāxir	totally
قوام ʾawām	quickly
حاجة ḥāje	enough!
بس bass	only
كمان kamān(e)	also
دغري duḡri	straight on
لألله laʾalla	lit. 'to God', used as an intensifier
عادي ʕādi	lit. 'ordinary' or 'it makes no difference'
عشان هيك ʕašān hēk	therefore
مبلا mbala	it is so
أكيد ʾakīd	assuredly
يمكن yimken / بركي barki	maybe

== Negation ==
لا lā and لأ laʔ mean “no.”

Verbs and prepositional phrases can be negated by the particle ما mā / ma either on its own or, in South Levantine, together with the suffix ـش -iš at the end of the verb or prepositional phrase. In Palestinian, it is also common to negate verbs by the suffix ـش -iš only.

Examples of negation with mā and -š
Without -š		With -š		English
Levantine (Arabic)	Levantine (Latin)	Levantine (Arabic)	Levantine (Latin)	English
ما كتب.	mā katab.	ما كتبش.	ma katab-š.	He didn't write.
ما بحكي إنكليزي.	mā baḥki ʾinglīzi.	ما بحكيش إنكليزي.	ma baḥkī-š ʾinglīzi.	I don't speak English.
ما تنسى!	mā tinsa!	ما تنساش!	ma tinsā-š!	Don't forget!
ما بده ييجي عالحفلة.	mā biddo yīji ʕa-l-ḥafle.	—N/a		He doesn't want to come to the party.

مش miš or in Syrian Arabic مو mū negates adjectives (including active participles), demonstratives, and nominal phrases.

Examples of negation with miš
Levantine (Arabic)	Levantine (Latin)	English
أنا مش فلسطيني.	ʾana miš falasṭīni.	I'm not Palestinian.
مش عارفة.	miš ʕārfe.	I (fem.) don't know.
هادا مش منيح.	hāda miš mnīḥ.	That's not good.

The particles عم (ʕam) and رح (raḥ) can be negated with either ما mā or مش miš.

Levantine (Arabic)	Levantine (Latin)	English
ما رح أروح.	mā raḥ ʾarūḥ.	I won't go.
مش رح أروح.	miš raḥ ʾarūḥ.	I won't go.

=== Negative copula ===
North Levantine has a negative copula formed by ما mā / ma and a suffixed pronoun.

Negative copula in Levantine
		Singular	Plural
1st person (m/f)		ماني māni	مانا māna
2nd person	m	مانَك mānak	مانكُن mānkon
2nd person	f	مانِك mānek	مانكُن mānkon
3rd person	m	مانو māno	مانلُن mānon
3rd person	f	مانا māna	مانلُن mānon

== Subordination ==
Relative clauses are formed with the particle yalli/illi/halli (the one who) when definite things are being described. It can be used either for people (who) or objects (that, which).

If the noun to which the relative pronoun refers is indefinite and non specific, the relative clause is linked without any coordinating conjunction and is indistinguishable from an independent sentence.

Examples of relative clauses
English	Levantine (Arabic)	Levantine (Latin)	Note
I saw the boy who was playing football.	شفت الولد اللي كان يلعب فطبول	šuft il-walad illi kān yilʕab faṭbōl.	Definite subject: use of illi
I saw a girl playing football.	شفت بنت كانت تلعب فطبول	šuft bint kānat tilʕab faṭbōl.	Indefinite subject: sentences connected without a pronoun

In formal speech, sentence complements can be introduced with the particle ʔǝnn ("that"), to which some speakers attach a personal pronoun (o or i).

For circumstantial clauses, the conjunction w- introduces subordinate clauses with the sense "while, when, with".

Temporal adverbs such as baʕd (after) may be used with the "ma" to form a subordinate clause: baʕd ma tnaːm ("after she goes to sleep").

== Conjunctions ==
Common conjunctions
Levantine	English
و w ~ u	and (also with temporal meaning "then, during...")
أو ʾaw	or
يا ... يا ya ... ya	either ... or
بس bass	but
لإنه laʾinno / حاكم ḥākem / لأن laʾann(o) (Beirut)	because
لما lamma / بس bass	as soon as
وقت waʾt / وقت اللي waʾt illi	when
ما ... إلا ma ... ʾilla	just as soon as, hardly
طالما ṭāla ma	as long as
تـ ta	so that, until
عشان ʕašān	so that
كل ما kull/kill ma	every time that
على بين ما (ʕa)la bēn ma	until
أحسن ما ʾaḥsan ma	rather than
لـ la / حتى ḥatta / لحتى la ḥatta / منشان minšān	in order to
لـ la	lest
إذا ʾiza / لو law / إن ʾin / إذاً ʾizan (Amman)	if

== Sources ==
- Aldrich, Matthew (8 July 2017). Levantine Arabic Verbs: Conjugation Tables and Grammar. Lingualism. ISBN 978-0-9986411-3-3. OCLC 1083130827.
- Aldrich, Matthew (9 February 2021). Palestinian Arabic verbs: conjugation tables and grammar. Lingualism. ISBN 978-1-949650-27-3. OCLC 1249659359.
- Al-Masri, Mohammad (28 August 2015). Colloquial Arabic (Levantine): The Complete Course for Beginners. Colloquial Series. London: Routledge. ISBN 978-0-415-72685-6. OCLC 919431090.
- Brustad, Kristen; Zuniga, Emilie (6 March 2019). "Chapter 16: Levantine Arabic". In Huehnergard, John; Pat-El, Na‘ama (eds.). The Semitic languages (2nd ed.). London & New York: Routledge Taylor & Francis Group. pp. 403–432. doi:10.4324/9780429025563. ISBN 978-0-429-02556-3. S2CID 166512720.
- Cowell, Mark W. (1964). A Reference Grammar of Syrian Arabic. Georgetown University Press. ISBN 1-58901-003-5. OCLC 249229002.
- Elihai, Yohanan (2011a). Speaking Arabic: a course in conversational Eastern (Palestinian) Arabic. Book 1. Jerusalem: Minerva. ISBN 978-965-7397-16-9. OCLC 1076023526.
- Elihai, Yohanan (2011b). Speaking Arabic: a course in conversational Eastern (Palestinian) Arabic. Book 2. Jerusalem: Minerva. ISBN 978-965-7397-17-6. OCLC 1073572583.
- Elihai, Yohanan (2010). Speaking Arabic: a course in conversational Eastern (Palestinian) Arabic. Book 3. Jerusalem: Minerva. ISBN 978-965-7397-18-3. OCLC 755643505.
- Elihai, Yohanan (2011c). Speaking Arabic: a course in conversational Eastern (Palestinian) Arabic. Book 4. Jerusalem: Minerva. ISBN 978-965-7397-19-0. OCLC 755644028.
- Elihay, J. (2012). The Olive Tree Dictionary: A Transliterated Dictionary of Eastern Arabic (Palestinian) (2nd ed.). Jerusalem: Minerva. ISBN 978-965-7397-06-0. OCLC 825044014.
- Liddicoat, Mary-Jane; Lennane, Richard; Abdul Rahim, Iman (June 2018). Syrian Colloquial Arabic: A Functional Course (Rev. 3rd ed. (online) ed.). M. Liddicoat. ISBN 978-0-646-49382-4. OCLC 732638712.
- Nammur-Wardini, Rita (6 May 2011). L'arabe libanais de poche (in French). Assimil. ISBN 978-2-7005-0357-9. OCLC 758528127.
- Tiedemann, Fridrik E. (26 March 2020). The Most Used Verbs in Spoken Arabic: Jordan & Palestine (4th ed.). Amman: Great Arabic Publishing. ISBN 978-1734460407.
