= Elative =

Elative can refer to:

- Elative case, a grammatical case in Finno-Ugric languages and others
- Elative (gradation), an inflection used in Semitic languages to express the comparative and the superlative
