= Arabic nouns and adjectives =

Declined according to case, state, gender and number

Arabic nouns and adjectives are declined according to case, state, gender and number. While this is strictly true in Classical Arabic, in colloquial or spoken Arabic, there are a number of simplifications such as loss of certain final vowels and loss of case. A number of derivational processes exist for forming new nouns and adjectives. Adverbs can be formed from adjectives.

== Noun and adjective inflection (Classical Arabic) ==
Nouns (اِسْمٌ ism) and adjectives in Classical Arabic are declined according to the following properties:

- Case (nominative, genitive, and accusative)
- State (indefinite, definite or construct)
- Gender (masculine or feminine): an inherent characteristic of nouns, but part of the declension of adjectives
- Number (singular, dual or plural)

Nouns are normally given in their pausal form. For example, مَلِك malik 'king' would be declined as مَلِكٌ malikun 'king-NOM.SG.INDF', اَلْمَلِكُ al-maliku 'the king-NOM.SG.DEF', etc. A feminine noun like مَلِكَة malikah 'queen' would be declined as مَلِكَةٌ malikatun 'queen-NOM.SG.INDF', اَلْمَلِكَةُ al-malikatu 'the queen-NOM.SG.DEF', etc. The citation form with final ـَة -ah reflects the formal pausal pronunciation of this word (i.e. as it would be pronounced at the end of an utterance) – although in practice the h is not usually pronounced, and hence the word may be cited in some sources as malika.

=== Overview of inflection ===
The following table is an overview of noun and adjective inflection in Classical Arabic:

Noun and Adjective Inflection (Classical Arabic)
Declension→		(1) Regular Triptote									(2) Triptote w/ "Long Construct"	(3) Diptote	(4) Defective in -in (usu. masc.)			(5) Defective in -an (usu. masc.)			(6) Invariable in -ā	
Declension→		(1a) No suffix (usu. masc.)			(1b) in ـَة (-at-) (usu. feminine)			(1c) in ـَاة (-āt-) (usu. feminine)			(2) Triptote w/ "Long Construct"	(3) Diptote	(4) Defective in -in (usu. masc.)			(5) Defective in -an (usu. masc.)			(6) Invariable in -ā	
Pausal pronun. (in singular) →		-			-ah			-āh			-ū, -ā, -ī	-	-ī			-ā			-ā	
Informal pronun. (in singular) →		-			-a			-āt			-ū	-	-ī			-ā			-ā	
Number ↓	State→ Case↓	Indef.	Def.	Const.	Indef.	Def.	Const.	Indef.	Def.	Const.	Const.	Indef.	Indef.	Def.	Const.	Indef.	Def.	Const.	Indef., Def.	Const.
Singular	Nominative	-un	-u		-at-un	-at-u		-āt-un	-āt-u		-ū	-u	-in	-ī		-an	-ā		-ā	
Singular	Accusative	-an	-a		-at-an	-at-a		-āt-an	-āt-a		-ā	-a	-iyan, -iya	-iya		-an	-ā		-ā	
Singular	Genitive	-in	-i		-at-in	-at-i		-āt-in	-āt-i		-ī	-a	-in	-ī		-an	-ā		-ā	
Dual	Nominative	-āni		-ā	-at-āni		-at-ā	-āt-āni		-āt-ā	same as (1a) regular triptote		-iy-āni		-iy-ā	-ay-āni, -aw-āni		-ay-ā, -aw-ā	-ay-āni	-ay-ā
Dual	Accusative, Genitive	-ayni		-ay	-at-ayni		-at-ay	-āt-ayni		-āt-ay	same as (1a) regular triptote		-iy-ayni		-iy-ay	-ay-ayni, -aw-ayni		-ay-ay, -aw-ay	-ay-ayni	-ay-ay
Declension→		(7) Sound Masculine			(8) Sound Feminine						same as (1a) regular triptote		(7) Sound Masculine			(9) Defective in -an			–	
Plural	Nominative	-ūna		-ū	-ātun	-ātu		-ay-ātun, -aw-ātun	-ay-ātu, -aw-ātu		same as (1a) regular triptote		-ūna		-ū	-awna		-aw	–	
Plural	Accusative, Genitive	-īna		-ī	-ātin	-āti		-ay-ātin, -aw-ātin	-ay-āti, -aw-āti		same as (1a) regular triptote		-īna		-ī	-ayna		-ay	–	

NOTE:

- The plural forms listed are actually separate declensions. Most singular adjectives of the indicated declensions, as well as some singular nouns, are declined in the plural according to the indicated plural declensions. However, most nouns have a plural from a different declension — either a sound plural (declined according to one of the plural declensions, sometimes with a different stem as well) or a broken plural (invariably with a different stem, and declined according to one of the singular declensions). Some adjectives also have broken plurals (again, with different stems, and declined according to one of the singular declensions). See the discussion below on case for more details.
- The so-called "sound masculine" and "sound feminine" plural declensions refer to form, not gender – grammatically masculine nouns often have sound feminine plurals, and occasionally vice versa. (Note, however, that most nouns of this sort are inanimate objects, and as a result actually have feminine-singular agreement in the plural, regardless of their inherent gender or the form of their plural. See discussion below.)
- Diptotes are declined exactly like regular triptotes other than in the singular indefinite state.
- In the defective-in--in declension, accusative -iyan occurs in singular nouns, while -iya occurs in broken plurals (especially three-syllable broken plurals such as layālin "nights" or ʼayādin "hands", whose stem is of a form that would be declined as a diptote if it were declined regularly).
- There are only limited classes of invariable nouns and adjectives and none have their own plural declension; instead, they decline like one of the other singular or plural declensions.
- Only a limited number of nouns in -an have a dual in -awāni/-awayni; all of these are short nouns with a two-character stem, and are spelled in Arabic script with a "tall alif" (ـا) rather than alif maqṣūrah (ـی). Examples are ʻaṣan عصاً "stick" (and possibly riḍan رضاً "approval").

The following table shows some examples of noun inflections.

Examples of inflection in nouns
Singular	Declension	Meaning	Gender	Type,Notes	Root	Plural	Declension
yad	(1a) triptote	hand	feminine	root noun	y-d	ʼaydin	(4) broken plural defective in -in
yad	(1a) triptote	hand	feminine	root noun	y-d	ʼayādin	(4) broken plural defective in -in
ʼab	(2) "long construct" triptote	father	masculine	root noun	ʼ-b	ʼābāʼ	(1a) broken plural triptote
yawm	(1a) triptote	day	masculine	root noun	y-w-m	ʼayyām	(1a) broken plural triptote
laylah	(1b) triptote in -ah	night	feminine	root noun	l-y-l	laylāt	(8) sound feminine plural
laylah	(1b) triptote in -ah	night	feminine	root noun	l-y-l	layālin	(4) broken plural defective in -in
baḥr	(1a) triptote	sea	masculine	root noun	b-ḥ-r	biḥār	(1a) broken plural triptote
baḥr	(1a) triptote	sea	masculine	root noun	b-ḥ-r	buḥūr	(1a) broken plural triptote
baḥr	(1a) triptote	sea	masculine	root noun	b-ḥ-r	ʼabḥār	(1a) broken plural triptote
baḥr	(1a) triptote	sea	masculine	root noun	b-ḥ-r	ʼabḥur	(1a) broken plural triptote
ʼarḍ	(1a) triptote	land	feminine	root noun	ʼ-r-ḍ	ʼarāḍin	(4) broken plural defective in -in
ʼarḍ	(1a) triptote	land	feminine	root noun	ʼ-r-ḍ	ʼaraḍūna	(7) sound masculine plural
ṭālib	(1a) triptote	student	masculine	Form I active participle	ṭ-l-b	ṭullāb	(1a) broken plural triptote
ṭālib	(1a) triptote	student	masculine	Form I active participle	ṭ-l-b	ṭalabah	(1b) broken plural triptote in -ah
muʻallim	(1a) triptote	teacher	masculine	Form II active participle	ʻ-l-m	muʻallimūna	(7) sound masculine plural
ḥayāh	(1c) triptote in -āh	life	feminine	Form I verbal noun	ḥ-y-w	ḥayawāt	(8) sound feminine plural
ḥayawān	(1a) triptote	animal	masculine	derived noun in -ān (intensive)	ḥ-y-w	ḥayawānāt	(7) sound feminine plural
qāḍin	(4) defective in -in	judge	masculine	Form I active participle	q-ḍ-y	quḍāh	(1c) broken plural triptote in -āh
qaḍiyyah	(1b) triptote in -ah	lawsuit	feminine	derived noun (verbal-noun form, Form I)	q-ḍ-y	qaḍāyā	(6) broken plural invariable -ā
mustašfan	(5) defective in -an	hospital	masculine	Form X noun of place (passive-particle form)	š-f-y	mustašfayāt	(7) sound feminine plural
kitāb	(1a) triptote	book	masculine	derived noun (verbal-noun form, Form I or possibly Form III)	k-t-b	kutub	(1a) broken plural triptote
maktab	(1a) triptote	desk, office	masculine	Form I noun of place	k-t-b	makātib	(3) broken plural diptote
maktabah	(1b) triptote in -ah	library	feminine	Form I noun of place	k-t-b	maktabāt	(8) sound feminine plural
maktabah	(1b) triptote in -ah	library	feminine	Form I noun of place	k-t-b	makātib	(3) broken plural diptote
dunyā	(6) invariable -ā	world (lit. "lowest (place)")	feminine	nominalized feminine elative adjective	d-n-y	dunyayāt	(8) sound feminine plural
ṣaḥrāʼ	(3) diptote	desert (lit. "desert-like (place)" < "desert-sand-colored")	feminine	nominalized feminine color/defect adjective	ṣ-ḥ-r	ṣaḥārin	(4) broken plural defective in -in
ṣaḥrāʼ	(3) diptote	desert (lit. "desert-like (place)" < "desert-sand-colored")	feminine	nominalized feminine color/defect adjective	ṣ-ḥ-r	ṣaḥārā	(6) broken plural invariable -ā
ṣaḥrāʼ	(3) diptote	desert (lit. "desert-like (place)" < "desert-sand-colored")	feminine	nominalized feminine color/defect adjective	ṣ-ḥ-r	ṣaḥrāwāt	(8) sound feminine plural
šaǧarah	(1b) triptote in -ah	tree	feminine	noun of unity	š-ǧ-r	šaǧar	(1a) triptote, root noun, collective singular ("trees" in general)
šaǧarah	(1b) triptote in -ah	tree	feminine	noun of unity	š-ǧ-r	šaǧarāt	(8) sound feminine plural, plural of paucity ("trees" when counting 3–10)
šaǧarah	(1b) triptote in -ah	tree	feminine	noun of unity	š-ǧ-r	ʼašǧār	(1a) broken plural triptote, plural of variety ("different kinds of trees")
ʻabd	(1a) triptote	slave, servant	masculine	derived noun (verbal-noun form)	ʻ-b-d	ʻabīd	(1a) broken plural triptote
ʻabd	(1a) triptote	slave, servant	masculine	derived noun (verbal-noun form)	ʻ-b-d	ʻubdān	(1a) broken plural triptote
ʻabd	(1a) triptote	slave, servant	masculine	derived noun (verbal-noun form)	ʻ-b-d	ʻibdān	(1a) broken plural triptote
ʻabd	(1a) triptote	servant (of God), human being	masculine	derived noun (verbal-noun form)	ʻ-b-d	ʻibād	(1a) broken plural triptote
tilifizyūn	(1a) triptote	television	masculine	borrowed noun	—	tilifizyūnāt	(8) sound feminine plural
film	(1a) triptote	film	masculine	borrowed noun	— (or f-l-m)	ʼaflām	(1a) broken plural triptote
sigārah	(1b) triptote in -ah	cigarette	feminine	borrowed noun	— (or s-g-r)	sagāʼir	(3) broken plural diptote

The following table shows some examples of adjective inflections.

Examples of inflection in adjectives
Type,Notes	Root	Meaning	Masculine Singular	Declension	Feminine Singular	Declension	Masculine Plural	Declension	Feminine Plural	Declension
faʻīl	k-b-r	big	kabīr	(1a) triptote	kabīrah	(1b) triptote in -ah	kibār	(1a) broken plural triptote	kabīrāt	(8) sound feminine plural
faʻīl	k-b-r	big	kabīr	(1a) triptote	kabīrah	(1b) triptote in -ah	kubarāʼ	(3) broken plural diptote	kabīrāt	(8) sound feminine plural
elative	k-b-r	bigger, biggest	ʼakbar	(3) diptote	kubrā	(6) invariable -ā	ʼakbarūna	(7) sound masculine plural	kubrayāt	(8) sound feminine plural
elative	k-b-r	bigger, biggest	ʼakbar	(3) diptote	kubrā	(6) invariable -ā	ʼakābir	(3) broken plural diptote	kubrayāt	(8) sound feminine plural
faʻīl, third-weak	d-n-w	near, low	daniyy	(1a) triptote	daniyyah	(1b) triptote in -ah	ʼadniyāʼ	(3) broken plural diptote	daniyyāt	(8) sound feminine plural
elative, third-weak	d-n-w	nearer, nearest; lower, lowest	ʼadnā	(6) invariable -ā	dunyā	(6) invariable -ā	ʼadānin	(4) broken plural defective in -in	dunan	(5) broken plural defective in -an
elative, third-weak	d-n-w	nearer, nearest; lower, lowest	ʼadnā	(6) invariable -ā	dunyā	(6) invariable -ā	ʼadnawna	(7) sound masculine plural defective in -an	dunyawāt	(8) sound feminine plural
color/defect	ḥ-m-r	red	ʼaḥmar	(3) diptote	ḥamrāʼ	(3) diptote	ḥumr	(1a) broken plural triptote	ḥumr	(1a) broken plural triptote
faʻlān (intensive)	ʻ-ṭ-š	thirsty	ʻaṭšān	(3) diptote	ʻaṭšā	(6) invariable -ā	ʻiṭāš	(1a) broken plural triptote	?	?
faʻlān (intensive)	ʻ-ṭ-š	thirsty	ʻaṭšān	(3) diptote	ʻaṭšā	(6) invariable -ā	ʻaṭšā	(6) broken plural invariable -ā	?	?

=== Number ===
Arabic distinguishes between nouns based on number (عَدَدٌ ʻadad). All nouns are singular (مُفْرَدٌ mufrad) dual (مُثَنًّى muṯannā), or plural (جَمْعٌ ǧamʻ). In Classical Arabic, the use of the dual is mandatory whenever exactly two objects are referred to, regardless of whether the "two-ness" of the objects is explicit or not. For example, in a sentence like "I picked up my children from school yesterday and then helped them with their homework", the words "children", "them" and "their" must be in the dual if exactly two children are referred to, regardless of whether the speaker wants to make this fact explicit or not. This implies that when the plural is used, it necessarily implies three or more. (Colloquial varieties of Arabic are very different in this regard, as the dual is normally used only for emphasis, i.e. in cases similar to when an English speaker would use the word "two".)

Nouns take either a sound plural or broken plural. The sound plural is formed by adding endings, and can be considered part of the declension. The broken plural, however, is a different stem. It may belong to a different declension (see below), and is declined as a singular noun. For example, the plural of the masculine triptote noun كِتَاب kitāb "book" is كُتُب kutub, which is declined as a normal singular triptote noun: indefinite nominative كُتُبٌ kutubun; indefinite accusative كُتُباً kutuban; indefinite genitive كُتُبٍ kutubin; etc. On the other hand, the masculine triptote noun مَكْتَب maktab "desk, office" has the plural مَكَاتِب makātib, which declines as a singular diptote noun: indefinite nominative مَكَاتِبُ makātibu; indefinite accusative/genitive مَكَاتِبَ makātiba; etc.

Generally, the only nouns that have the "masculine" sound plural ـُونَ, ـِينَ -ūn, -īn are nouns referring to male human beings (e.g. مُهَنْدِس muhandis "engineer"). On the other hand, the feminine sound plural -āt occurs not only on nouns referring to female human beings, but also on many nouns referring to objects, whether masculine or feminine (e.g. masculine اِمْتِحَان imtiḥān "exam", feminine سَيَّارَة sayyārah "car"). Note that all inanimate objects take feminine singular or feminine plural agreement in the plural, regardless of their "inherent" gender and regardless of the form of the plural.

Some nouns have two or more plural forms, usually to distinguish between different meanings.

There are over 70 broken plural patterns of which only 31 are common. These patterns are usually unpredictable and should be memorized for every word, however according to the generative linguistics McCarthy and Prince (1990), it's possible to guess the main broken plural form of around 83% of all CVCC and CVCVC nouns by using an algorithm that analyses syllables in moraic trochees.

=== Gender ===
Arabic has two genders (جِنْسٌ ǧins): masculine (مُذَكَّرٌ muḏakkar) and feminine (مُؤَنَّثٌ muʼannaṯ). As mentioned above, verbs, adjectives and pronouns must agree in gender with the corresponding noun. Gender in Arabic is logically very similar to a language like Spanish: animate nouns, such as those referring to people, usually have the grammatical gender corresponding to their natural gender, but for inanimate nouns the grammatical gender is largely arbitrary.

Most feminine nouns end in ـَة -at-, but some do not (e.g. أُمّ ʼumm "mother", أَرْض ʼarḍ "earth"). Most words ending in ـَا are also feminine (and are indeclinable).

The letter ة used for feminine nouns is a special form known as تَاء مَرْبُوطَة tāʼ marbūṭah "tied T", which looks like the letter hāʼ (h) with the two dots that form part of the letter tāʼ (t) written above it. This form indicates that the feminine ending -at- is pronounced -ah- in pausa (at the end of an utterance). Words with the ending ـَة never take alif ending for the indefinite accusative. Thus, اِبْنًا ibnan ("son", ACC SG INDEF) has final alif, but اِبْنَةً ibnatan ("daughter", ACC SG INDEF) does not.

In the colloquial variants, and in all but the most formal pronunciations of spoken Modern Standard Arabic, the feminine ending -at appears only with nouns in the construct state, and the ending is simply pronounced -a in all other circumstances.

=== State ===
The grammatical property of state is specific to Arabic and other Semitic languages. The basic division is between definite and indefinite, corresponding approximately to English nouns preceded, respectively, by the (the definite article) and a or an (the indefinite article). More correctly, a definite noun signals either a particular entity previously referenced or a generic concept, and corresponds to one of the following in English: English nouns preceded by the, this, that, or a possessive adjective (e.g. my, your); English nouns taken in a generic sense ("Milk is good", "Dogs are friendly"); or proper nouns (e.g. John or Muhammad). Indefinite nouns refer to entities not previously mentioned, and correspond to either English nouns preceded by a, an or some, or English mass nouns with no preceding determiner and not having a generic sense ("We need milk").

Definite nouns are usually marked by a definite article prefix اَلـ al- (which is reduced to l- following vowels, and further assimilates to (a)t-, (a)s-, (a)r- etc. preceding certain consonants). Indefinite nouns are usually marked by nunation (a following -n). Adjectives modifying a noun agree with the noun in definiteness, and take the same markings:

- كَلْبٌ كَبِيرٌ kalbun kabīrun "a big dog (nom.)"
- رَأَيْتُ كَلْباً كَبِيراً raʼaytu kalban kabīran "I saw a big dog (acc.)"
- مَعَ كَلْبٍ كَبِيرٍ maʻa kalbin kabīrin "with a big dog (gen.)"
- اَلْكَلْبُ ٱلْكَبِيرُ al-kalbu l-kabīru "the big dog (nom.)"
- كَلْبُهَا ٱلْكَبِيرُ kalbu-hā l-kabīru "her big dog (nom.)" (the definite article does not appear with a suffixed possessive, but the noun is still definite, so the adjective takes the definite article)
- رَأَيْتُ صُورَةً جَمِيلَةً raʼaytu ṣūratan ǧamīlatan "I saw a nice picture (acc.)"
- مِصْرُ ٱلْقَدِيمَةُ Miṣru l-qadīmatu "Ancient Egypt (nom.)" (proper nouns do not take the definite article, but are still definite)

A third value for state is construct. Nouns assume the construct state when they are definite and modified by another noun in an iḍāfah (Classical Arabic: إِضَافَةٌ, iḍāfah), the Arabic realization of a genitive construction. For example, in a construction like "the daughter of John", the Arabic word corresponding to "the daughter" is placed in the construct state and is marked neither with a definite article nor with nunation, even though it is semantically definite. Furthermore, no other word can intervene between a construct-state noun and a following genitive, other than in a few exceptional cases. An adjective modifying a construct-state noun is in the definite state and is placed after the modifying genitive. Examples:

- بِنْتُ ٱلْمَلِكَةِ bintu l-malikati "the daughter (nom.) of the queen"
- بِنْتُ ٱلْمَلِكَةِ ٱلْقَصِيرَةُ bintu l-malikati l-qaṣīratu "the short daughter (nom.) of the queen"
- بِنْتُ ٱلْمَلِكَةِ ٱلْقَصِيرَةِ bintu l-malikati l-qaṣīrati "the daughter (nom.) of the short queen"
- بِنْتِ ٱلْمَلِكَةِ ٱلْقَصِيرَةِ binti l-malikati l-qaṣīrati "the short daughter (gen.) of the queen" or "the daughter (gen.) of the short queen"

Note that the adjective must follow the genitive regardless of which of the two nouns it modifies, and only the agreement characteristics (case, gender, etc.) indicate which noun is modified.

The construct state is likewise used for nouns with an attached possessive suffix:

- بِنْتُهَا bintu-hā "her daughter (nom.)"
- بِنْتِهَا binti-hā "her daughter (gen.)"
- بِنْتُهُ bintu-hu "his daughter (nom.)"
- بِنْتِهِ binti-hi "his daughter (gen.)"
- بِنْتِي bint-ī "my daughter (nom./acc./gen.)"
- مَلِكَتِهَا malikati-hā "her queen (gen.)"
- كِلْبُهَا kalbu-hā "her dog (nom.)"
- كَلْبُهَا ٱلْكَبِيرُ kalbu-hā l-kabīru "her big dog (nom.)"

Note that in writing, the special form tāʼ marbūṭah indicating the feminine changes into a regular tāʼ before suffixes. This does not affect the formal pronunciation.

When an indefinite noun is modified by another noun, the construct state is not used. Instead, a construction such as بِنْتٌ لِلْمَلِكَةِ bintun li-l-malikati lit. "a daughter to the queen" is used.

Note also the following appositional construction:

- اَلْبَيْتُ وَاسِعُ ٱلنَّوَافِذِ al-baytu wāsiʻu l-nawāfiḏi "the house with the wide windows" (lit. "the house wide of windows")

=== Article ===
The article (أَدَاةُ ٱلتَّعْرِيفِ ʼadāt at-taʻrīf) الـ al- is indeclinable and expresses the definite state of a noun of any gender and number. As mentioned above, it is also prefixed to each of that noun's modifying adjectives. The initial vowel (هَمْزَةُ ٱلْوَصْلِ hamzatu l-waṣli), is volatile in the sense that it disappears in sandhi, the article becoming mere l- (although the ʼalif is retained in orthography in any case as it is based on pausal pronunciation).

Also, the l is assimilated to a number of consonants (dentals and sibilants), so that in these cases, the article in pronunciation is expressed only by geminating the initial consonant of the noun (while in orthography, the writing الـ ʼalif lām is retained, and the gemination may be expressed by putting šaddah on the following letter).

The consonants causing assimilation (trivially including ل (l)) are ت (t), ث (ṯ), د (d), ذ (ḏ), ر (r), ز (z), س (s), ش (š), ص (ṣ), ض (ḍ), ط (ṭ), ظ (ẓ), ل (l), ن (n). These 14 letters are called 'solar letters' (اَلْحُرُوفُ ٱلشَّمْسِيَّةُ al-ḥurūf aš-šamsiyyah), while the remaining 14 are called 'lunar letters' or 'moon letters' (اَلْحُرُوفُ ٱلْقَمَرِيَّةُ al-ḥurūf al-qamariyyah). The solar letters all have in common that they are dental, alveolar, and postalveolar consonants (all coronals) in the classical language, and the lunar consonants are not. (ج ǧīm is pronounced postalveolar in most varieties of Arabic today, but was actually a palatalized voiced velar plosive in the classical language, and is thus considered a lunar letter; nevertheless, in colloquial Arabic, the ج ǧīm is often spoken as if solar.)

=== Agreement ===
Adjectives generally agree with their corresponding nouns in gender, number, case and state. Pronouns and verbs likewise agree in person, gender and number. However, there is an important proviso: inanimate plural nouns take feminine-singular agreement. This so-called "deflected agreement" applies to all agreement contexts, whether of adjectives, verbs or pronouns, and applies regardless of both the inherent gender of the noun (as indicated by singular and dual agreement) and the form of the plural of the noun. Note that this does not apply to dual nouns, which always have "strict agreement".

=== Case ===
There are six basic noun/adjective singular declensions:

- The normal triptote declension, which includes the majority of nouns and adjectives. The basic property is a three-way case marking distinction -u -a -i. An example is كِتَاب kitāb "book", with indefinite declension كِتَابٌ kitābun, كتاباً kitāban, كِتَابٍ kitābin and definite declension اَلْكِتَابُ al-kitābu, اَلْكِتَابَ al-kitāba, اَلْكِتَابِ al-kitābi. Most feminine nouns have an additional stem ـَة (-at-), and decline the same way. Some feminine nouns (and a few masculine nouns) have a variant stem ـَاة (-āt-), again with the same declensional endings. Note that there are some cases of nouns (and a few adjectives) whose gender does not match the stem form (in both directions). In addition, some masculine nouns (with and without ـَة) have broken plurals in ـَة, and likewise some feminine nouns have broken plurals without ـَة. This affects the form, but not the inherent gender (or agreement properties) of these nouns.
- The diptote declension, which refers to words whose genitive and accusative inflections are identical. When the noun is indefinite, the endings are -u for the nominative and -a for the genitive and accusative with no nunation. The genitive reverts to the normal -i when the diptotic noun becomes definite (preceded by al- or is in the construct state)). These words are missing the nunation (final -n-) normally marking the indefinite. The class of diptote nouns mostly includes certain names, and broken plurals of particular forms (especially those with four stem consonants and three-syllable stems, as in مَكَاتِب makātib "desks, offices". Certain adjectives are also diptotes, such as the form أَفْعَل ʼafʻal of masculine singular elative (i.e. comparative/superlative) and color/defect adjectives, as well as the forms فَعْلَاء faʻlāʼ (feminine singular color/defect adjectives) and فَعْلَان faʻlān (masculine singular "intensive" adjectives expressing, but not exclusively, emotional concepts such as "angry, thirsty").
- The "long construct" declension. These are triptotes with long case endings -ū -ā -ī in the singular construct state, and normal triptote endings elsewhere. There are only five nouns in this declension, all very short (see below): أَب ʼab "father" (e.g. أَبُو حَسَنِ ʼabū ḥasan "the father of Hasan"); أَخ ʼaḫ "brother"; حَم ḥam "father-in-law"; فَم fam "mouth" (which assumes an irregular stem f- in the construct state, e.g. فُو fū "the mouth of (nom.)"); and ذُو ḏū "the owner of" (which appears only in construct and has a seriously irregular declension; see under demonstrative pronouns).
- The -in declension (Arabic اِسْمُ ٱلْمَنْقُوصِ ʼism al-manqūṣ). This is used primarily for nouns and adjectives whose final root consonant is -y or -w, and which would normally have an -i- before the last consonant (e.g. the active participles of third-weak verbs). Such words were once declined as normal triptotes, but sound change has caused the last stem syllable to collapse together with the ending, leading to an irregular declension. In adjectives, this irregularity occurs only in the masculine; such adjectives have a normal feminine with a stem ending in -iya-.
- The -an declension (Arabic اِسْمُ ٱلْمَقْصُورِ ʼism al-maqṣūr). Like the -in declension, this is used primarily for nouns and adjectives whose final root consonant is -y or -w, but these are words that would normally have an -a- before the last consonant (e.g. the passive participles of third-weak verbs). Again, sound change has caused the last stem syllable to collapse together with the ending, and again, in adjectives the irregularity occurs only in the masculine, with regularly-declined feminines having a stem ending in -āh (singular/dual) or -ayāt- (plural).
- The invariable -ā declension (written either with "tall" ألف ʼalif or أَلِفٌ مَقْصُورَةٌ ʼalif maqṣūrah). These words have the same form in all cases, both indefinite and definite. When this declension occurs in adjectives, it generally occurs as either the masculine or feminine singular portion of a complex paradigm with a differently-stemmed diptote conjugation in the other gender. Examples are the feminine singular of elative (i.e. comparative/superlative) adjectives, such as كُبْرَى kubrā "bigger/biggest (fem.)", and of "intensive" adjectives in فَعْلَان faʻlān, e.g. عَطْشَى ʻaṭšā "thirsty (fem.)". Masculine singular elatives and color/defect adjectives from third-weak roots have this declension themselves, e.g. أَعْمَى ʼaʻmā "blind", أَدْنَى ʼadnā "nearer, lower".

Many (but not all) nouns in the -in, -an or -ā declensions originate as adjectives of some sort, or as verbal nouns of third-weak verbs. Examples: قَاضٍ qāḍin "judge" (a form-I active participle); مُسْتَشْفىً mustašfan "hospital" (a form-X passive participle in its alternative meaning as a "noun of place"); فُصْحَى fusḥā "formal Arabic" (originally a feminine elative, lit. "the most eloquent (language)"); دنيا dunyā "world" (also a feminine elative, lit. "the lowest (place)"). In addition, many broken plurals are conjugated according to one of these declensions.

Note that all dual nouns and adjectives have the same endings -ā(ni)/-ay(ni), differing only in the form of the stem.

==== Nominative case ====
The nominative case (اَلْمَرْفُوعُ al-marfūʻ ) is used for:

- Subjects of a verbal sentence.
- Subjects and predicates of an equational (non-verbal) sentence, with some notable exceptions.
- Certain adverbs retain the nominative marker (although not necessarily representing the nominative case).
- The citation form of words is (if noted at all) in the nominative case.

For singular nouns and broken plurals, it is marked as a ḍammah (-u) for the definite or ضَمَّة ḍammah with nunation (-un) for the indefinite. The dual and regular masculine plural are formed by adding -āni and -ūna respectively (-ā and -ū in the construct state). The regular feminine plural is formed by adding -ātu in the definite and -ātun in the indefinite.

==== Accusative case ====
The accusative case (اَلْمَنْصُوبُ al-manṣūb(u)) is used for:

- Objects of a verbal sentence.
- The subject of an equational (non-verbal) sentence, if it is initiated with 'inna, or one of its "sisters".
- The predicate of كَانَ or يَكُونُ kāna or yakūnu "be" and its "sisters". Hence, اَلْفَتَاةُ جَمِيلَةٌ al-fatātu ǧamīlatun "the girl is beautiful" but كَانَتِ ٱلْفَتَاةُ جَمِيلَةً kānat-i-l-fatātu ǧamīla(tan) "the girl was beautiful" (spelling جميلة is not affected here (letter ـَة) in the unvocalised Arabic). The ending in brackets may not be pronounced in pausa or in informal Arabic.
- Both the subject and the predicate of ظَنَّ ẓanna and its sisters in an equational clause.
- The object of a transitive verb.
- Most adverbs.
- Internal object/cognate accusative structure.
- The accusative of specification/purpose/circumstantial.

For singular nouns and broken plurals, it is marked as a fatḥah (-a) for the definite or fatḥah + nunation (-an) for the indefinite. For the indefinite accusative, the fatḥah + nunation is added to an ʼalif e.g. ـًا, which is added to the ending of all nouns (e.g. كَانَ عَطْشَانًا kāna ʻaṭšāna(n) "he was thirsty") not ending with a ʼalif followed by hamzah or a tāʼ marbūṭah. The dual and regular masculine plural are formed by adding -ayn(i) and -īn(a) (both spelled ـين in Arabic) respectively (-ay and -ī in the construct state, both spelled ـي in Arabic). The regular feminine plural is formed by adding -āt(i) in the definite and -āt(in) in the indefinite, both spelled ـَات in Arabic.

==== Genitive case ====
The genitive case (اَلْمَجْرُورُ al-maǧrūr) is used for:

- Objects of prepositions.
- All, but not necessarily the first member (the first nomen regens), of an ʼiḍāfah (genitive construction) .
- The object of a locative adverb.
- Semi-prepositions if preceded by another (true or semi) preposition
- Objects of أي ʼayy "any".
- Elative (comparative/superlative) adjectives behave similarly: أَطْوَلُ وَلَدٍ "ʼaṭwalu waladin" "tallest boy('s)".

For singular nouns and broken plurals, it is marked as a كَسْرَة kasrah (-i) for the definite or كَسْرَة kasrah + nunation (-in) for the indefinite. The dual and regular masculine plural are formed by adding -ayn(i) and -īn(a) respectively (both spelled ـين in Arabic) (-ay and -ī in the construct state, both spelled ـي in Arabic). The regular feminine plural is formed by adding -āt(i) in the definite and -āt(in) in the indefinite, both spelled ـات in Arabic.

Note: diptotic nouns receive a fatḥah (-a) in the genitive indefinite and are never nunated.

=== Pronunciation ===
When speaking or reading aloud, nouns at the end of an utterance are pronounced in a special pausal form (اَلْوَقْفُ al-waqf). Final short vowels, as well as short vowels followed by a nunation, are omitted; but accusative -an sounds as -ā. The -t- in the feminine ending -at- sounds as -h-.

In writing, all words are written in their pausal form; special diacritics may be used to indicate the case endings and nunation, but are normally only found in books for students and children, in the Quran, and occasionally elsewhere to remove ambiguity. Only the accusative case for indefinite masculine nouns is often marked. Feminine nouns are indicated using a ة tāʼ marbūṭah (graphically, the letter for -h- with the markings for -t- added).

When speaking in less formal registers, words are essentially pronounced in their pausal form. When speaking or reading aloud, the case endings are generally omitted in less formal registers.

== Noun and adjective inflection in Colloquial Arabic ==
In the colloquial spoken varieties of Arabic, much of the inflectional and derivational grammar of Classical Arabic nouns and adjectives is unchanged. The colloquial varieties have all been affected by a change that deleted most final short vowels (also final short vowels followed by a nunation suffix -n), and shortened final long vowels.

Loss of case

The largest change is the total lack of any grammatical case in the colloquial variants. When case endings were indicated by short vowels, these are simply deleted. Otherwise, the pausal form of the original oblique case has been usually generalized to all cases (however, in "long construct" nouns, it is nominative -ū that has been generalized). The original nunation ending indicating the indefinite state is also lost in most varieties, and where it persists it has different functions (e.g. in conjunction with a modifier such as an adjective or relative clause). The distinction between triptote and diptote has vanished, as has the distinction between defective -an and invariable -ā, which are both rendered by -a (shortened from -ā); similarly, defective -in nouns now have an ending -i, shortened from pausal/definite -ī.

Even in Classical Arabic, grammatical case appears not to have been completely integrated into the grammar. The word order was largely fixed — contrary to the usual freedom of word order in languages with case marking (e.g. Latin, Russian) — and there are few cases in the Quran where omission of case endings would entail significant ambiguity of meaning. As a result, the loss of case entailed relatively little change in the grammar as a whole. In Modern Standard Arabic, case functions almost entirely as an afterthought: Most case endings are not pronounced at all, and even when the correct use of case endings is necessary (e.g. in formal, prepared speeches), the text is composed without consideration of case and later annotated with the correct endings.

Despite the loss of case, the original indefinite accusative ending -an survives in its adverbial usage.

Restriction of the dual number

The dual number is lost except on nouns, and even then its use is no longer functionally obligatory (i.e. the plural may also be used when referring to two objects, if the duality of the objects is not being emphasized). In addition, many varieties have two morphologically separate endings inherited from the Classical dual, one used with dual semantics and the other used for certain objects that normally come in pairs (e.g. eyes, ears) but with plural semantics. (It is sometimes suggested that only the latter variety was actually directly inherited, whereas the former variety was a late borrowing from the Classical language.) In some varieties (e.g. Moroccan Arabic), the former, semantic dual has nearly disappeared, and is used only with a limited number of nouns, especially those referring to cardinal numbers and units of measurement.

Changes to elative adjectives

Elative adjectives (those adjectives having a comparative and superlative meaning) are no longer inflected; instead, the masculine singular serves for all genders and numbers. Note that the most common way of saying e.g. "the largest boy" is أَكْبَر وَلَد ʼakbar walad, with the adjective in the construct state (rather than expected اَلْوَلَدُ ٱلْأَكْبَرُ *al-waladu l-ʼakbaru, with the adjective in its normal position after the noun and agreeing with it in state).

Preservation of remainder of system

Other than the above changes, the system is largely stable. The same system of two genders, sound and broken plurals, and the use of multiple stems to complete the declension of some nouns and adjectives still exists, and is little changed in its particulars.

The singular of feminine nouns is normally marked in -a. Former -in nouns are marked in -i, while former -an and -ā nouns are marked in -a, causing a formal merger in the singular with the feminine (but nouns that were masculine generally remain that way). The former "long feminine" marked with pausal -āh normally is marked with -āt in all circumstances (even outside of the construct state). Sound masculine plurals are marked with -īn, and sound feminine plurals with -āt; duals often use -ēn (< -ayn, still preserved in the occasional variety that has not undergone the changes ay > ē, aw > ō).

The system of three states also still exists. With loss of final -n, the difference between definite and indefinite simply comes down to presence or absence of the article al-. The construct state is distinguished by lack of al-, and in feminines in -a by a separate ending -at (or -it). The "older dual" (used for the plural of certain body parts, e.g. eyes and ears), which is often -ēn (< -ayn), has a separate construct form -ē (which becomes -ayya in combination with clitic suffix -ya "my"). Other duals, as well as sound plurals, do not normally have a construct state, but instead use an analytical genitive construction, using a particle with a meaning of "of" but whose form differs greatly from variant to variant, and which is used in a grammatical construction that exactly parallels the analytical genitive in English constructions such as "the father of the teacher".

== Noun and adjective derivation ==
A number of derivational processes exist for forming new nouns and adjectives. Most of these processes are non-concatenative, i.e. they involve a specific transformation applied to a root or word of a specific form, and cannot be arbitrarily combined or repeated to form longer and longer words. The only real concatenative derivational process is the nisba adjective -iyy-, which can be added to any noun (or even other adjective) to form an adjective meaning "related to X", and nominalized with the meaning "person related to X" (the same ending occurs in Arabic nationality adjectives borrowed into English such as "Iraqi", "Kuwaiti"). A secondary concatenative suffix is the feminine -ah, which can be added onto most nouns to make a feminine equivalent. The actual semantics are not very well-defined, but when added onto a noun indicating a man of some sort, they typically either refer to the women or objects with the same characteristics. The feminine nisba adjective -iyyah is commonly used to refer to abstract nouns (e.g. اِشْتِرَاكِيَّة ištirākiyyah "socialism"), and is sometimes added directly onto foreign nouns (e.g. دِيمُقْرَاطِيَّة dimuqrāṭiyyah "democracy").

The most productive means of derivational morphology of nouns is actually through the existing system of the participles (active and passive) and verbal nouns that are associated with each verb. These words can be "lexicalized" (made into separate lexical entries, i.e. words with their own specific meanings) by giving them additional semantics, much as the original English gerund "meeting" and passive participle "loaded" have been lexicalized from their original meanings of "the act of meeting (something)", "being loaded into/onto someone/something", so that (e.g.) "meeting" can mean "a gathering of people to discuss an issue, often business-related" and "loaded" can mean "having much money (of a person)", "with a bullet in it (of a gun)", etc.

The system of noun and adjective derivation described below is of Classical Arabic, but the system in the modern colloquial varieties is nearly unchanged. Changes occurring in particular formations are discussed below.

=== Collective nouns ===
Certain nouns in Arabic, especially those referring to plants, animals and other inanimate objects that often appear in groups, have a special collective declension. For those nouns, the formally singular noun has plural semantics, or refers to the objects as an undistinguished mass. In these nouns, the singular is formed by adding the feminine suffix ـَة (-ah), which forms the so-called singulative (اِسْمُ ٱلْوَحْدَةِ ʼismu l-waḥdah lit. "noun of unity"). These singulative nouns in turn can be pluralized, using either the broken plural or the sound feminine plural in -āt; this "plural of paucity" is used especially when counting objects between 3 and 10, and sometimes also with the meaning of "different kinds of ...". (When more than 10 objects are counted, Arabic requires the noun to be in the singular.)

Examples:

- حَجَر ḥajar "rocks" or "rock" (the material in general); حَجَرَة ḥajarah "a rock"
- شَجَر šajar "trees"; شَجَرَة šajarah "a tree"; أَشْجَار ʼašjār (3 to 10) "trees"
- قَمْح qamḥ "wheat", قَمْحَة qamḥah "a grain of wheat"
- بَقَر baqar "cattle"; بَقَرَة baqarah "a cow"

A similar singulative ending ـِيّ -iyy applies to human or other sentient beings:

- جُنْد jund "army"; جندي jundiyy "a soldier"
- جِنّ jinn "genies, jinns"; جِنِّيّ jinniyy "a genie"
- زِنْج zinj "black people" (as a race); زِنْجِىّ zinjiyy "a black person"

=== Nisba ===
The nisba (اَلنِّسْبَة nisbah) is a common suffix to form adjectives of relation or pertinence. The suffix is ـِيّ -iyy- for masculine and ـِيَّة -iyya(t)- for feminine gender (in other words, it is -iyy- and is inserted before the gender marker). An example is the noun لُبْنَانُ Lubnān(u) "Lebanon", where nisba are:

- لُبْنَانِيٌّ lubnāniyy(un) "Lebanese" (masculine nominative singular)
- لُبْنَانِيَّةٌ lubnāniyya(tun) "Lebanese" (feminine nominative singular)
- لُبْنَانِيُّونَ lubnāniyyūn(a) "Lebanese" (masculine nominative plural)
- لُبْنَانِيَّاتٌ lubnāniyyāt(un) "Lebanese" (feminine nominative plural)

A construct noun and nisbah-adjective is often equivalent to nominal composition in English and other languages (solar cell is equivalent to sun cell).

The feminine nisbah is often used in Arabic as a noun relating to concepts, most frequently corresponding to ones ending in -ism, with the masculine and feminine nisbah being used as adjectival forms of the concept-noun (e.g. -ist) depending on agreement. Thus the feminine nisbah of اَلْاِشْتِرَاك al-ištirāk "partnership, cooperation, participation (definite)", اَلْاِشْتِرَاكِيَّة al-ištirākiyyah is the Arabic word for "socialism," and the word "socialist" (both as an adjective and as the term for one who believes in socialism) is اِشْتِرَاكِيّ ištirākiyy in the masculine and اِشْتِرَاكِيَّة ištirākiyyah in the feminine.

The Arabic nisbah has given rise to English adjectives of nationality for Arabic countries: Iraqi (from عِرَاقِيّ), Kuwaiti (from كُوَيْتِيّ), etc.

=== Participles and verbal nouns ===
Every verb has associated active and passive participles, as well as a verbal noun (مَصْدَرٌ maṣdar, lit. "source"). The form of these participles and verbal nouns is largely predictable. For Form I (the basic type of verb), however, numerous possible shapes exist across the verbal nouns, and the form of the verbal noun for any given verb is unpredictable. In addition, some verbs have multiple verbal nouns, corresponding to different meanings of the verb.

All of these forms are frequently lexicalized (i.e. they are given additional meanings and become the origin of many lexical items in the vocabulary). In fact, participles and verbal nouns are one of the most productive sources of new vocabulary. A number of Arabic borrowings in English are actually lexicalized verbal nouns, or closely related forms. Examples are جِهَاد jihād (from the Form III verb جَاهَدَ ǧāhada "to strive"); انتفاضة intifāḍah (lit. "uprising", the feminine of the verbal noun of the Form VIII verb اِنْتَفَضَ intafaḍa "to rise up", technically an instance noun); إِسْلَام ’Islām (lit. "submission", from the Form IV verb أَسْلَمَ ’aslama); اِسْتِقْلَال istiqlāl (lit. "independence", from the Form X verb اِسْتَقَلَّ istaqalla). Many participles are likewise lexicalized, e.g. مُهَنْدِس muhandis "engineer" (the active participle of the Form I quadriliteral verb هَنْدَسَ handasa "to engineer").

Despite being unpredictable, linguists found that some maṣdar patterns correlate with certain semantic fields. The most prominent are:

- CāCaC: this pattern occurs only in loanwords, mostly from Aramaic (but occasionally from other languages as well). For example: عالم `ālam from Aramaic āləmā.
- CaCC: this is a very productive pattern used to 1) form action nouns mostly from transitive CaCaCa verbs and 2) form collectives from originally CāCiC nouns. Examples include: ركب rakb (group of riders) from راكب rākib (rider) and شرب sharb (group of drinkers) from شارب shārib (drinker).
- CiCC: this is also a very productive pattern. It's used to form 1) action nouns involving mental actions, 2) body parts, 3) paired objects, 4) period of time units and 5) the young of animals. Examples: رجل rijl (foot), كبد kibd (liver).

=== Occupational and characteristic nouns ===
Occupational nouns can be derived from many verb stems, generally using the form فَعَّال faʻʻāl, e.g. كَتَّاب kattāb "scribe" (from كَتَبَ kataba "to write"). The same pattern is used to form characteristic nouns, i.e. nouns with the meaning of "person who habitually does X" rather than an occupation as such, e.g. كَذَّاب kaḏḏāb "liar". The active participle can also be used to form occupational nouns, e.g. طَالِب ṭālib "student" (from طَلَبَ ṭalaba "to ask"), كَاتِب kātib "writer" (from كَتَبَ kataba "to write"), بَائِع bā'iʻ "vendor" (from بَاعَ bāʻa "to sell"), مُهَنْدِس muhandis "engineer" (from هَنْدَسَ handasa "to engineer"). In addition, some occupational nouns are in the form of a nisba (with an -iyy suffix), e.g. صُحُفَيّ ṣuḥufiyy or صِحَافِيّ ṣiḥāfiyy, both meaning "journalist" (derived respectively from صُحُف ṣuḥuf "newspapers" and صِحَافَة ṣiḥāfah "journalism").

=== Nouns of place ===
A common type of derivational noun is the noun of place, with a form مَفْعَل mafʻal or similar (prefix m(a)-), e.g. مَكْتَب maktab "desk / office", مَكْتَبَة maktabah "library" (both from كَتَبَ kataba "to write"); مَطْبَخ maṭbaḫ "kitchen" (from طَبَخَ ṭabaḫa "to cook"); مَسْرَح masraḥ "theater" (from سَرَحَ saraḥa "to release"). Nouns of place formed from verbs other than Form I have the same form as the passive participle, e.g. مُسْتَشْفىً mustašfan "hospital" (from the Form X verb اِسْتَشْفَى istašfā "to cure").

=== Tool nouns ===
Just as nouns of place are formed using a prefix ma-, tool nouns (also nouns of usage or nouns of instrument; Arabic اِسْمُ آلَةٍ ʼismu ʼālatin lit. "noun of tool") were traditionally formed using a prefix mi-. Examples are مِفْتَاح miftāḥ "key" (from فَتَحَ fataḥa "to open"); مِنْهَاج minhāǧ "road" (from نَهَجَ nahaǧa "to pursue"); مِكْتَال miktāl "large basket" (from كَتَلَ katala "to gather"); مِيزَان mīzān "balance (i.e. scales)" (from وَزَنَ wazana "to weigh"); مِكْسَحَة miksaḥah "broom" (from كَسَحَ kasaḥa "to sweep").

However, the current trend is to use a different form فَعَّالَة faʻʻālah. This is in origin a feminine occupational noun (e.g. كَتَّالَة kattālah "female scribe"). It has been repurposed in imitation of the English use of -er/or in similar nouns (refrigerator, freezer, record player, stapler, etc.) and following the general association in Arabic between the feminine gender and inanimate objects. The majority of modern inventions follow this form, e.g. نَظَّارَة naẓẓārah "telescope, eyeglasses" (نَظَرَ naẓara "to look"); ثَلَّاجَة ṯallāǧah "refrigerator" (ثَلَجَ ṯalaǧa "to freeze quickly" < ثَلْج ṯalǧ "snow"); دَبَّاسَة dabbāsah "stapler"; دَبَّابَة dabbābah "tank" (دَبَّ dabba "to crawl").

=== Instance nouns ===
An instance noun (nomen vicis or اِسْمُ مَرَّةِ ismu marrati) is a noun that indicates a single occurrence of an action, and uses the suffix -ah: e.g. ضَرْبَة ḍarbah "blow" (compare ضَرْب ḍarb "act of hitting, striking") or اِنْتِفَاضَة intifāḍah "intifada, an uprising" (compare اِنْتِفَاض intifāḍ "act of rising up, shaking off"). Instance nouns are generally formed from a verbal noun by the addition of the feminine ending. The terminology is unsettled; instance nouns are sometimes called "event instance nouns" or "nouns of single instance", or traditionally "nouns of unity", although this latter term is unsatisfactory because it can also refer to singulative nouns.

=== Diminutives ===
Diminutives (اَلْاِسْمُ ٱلْمُصَغَّرُ al-ʼismu l-muṣaġġaru "diminutive noun") usually follow a pattern فُعَيْل fuʻayl or similar (فُعَيْلِل fuʻaylil if there are four consonants). Examples are كُلَيْب kulayb "little dog" (كَلْب kalb "dog"); بُنَيّ bunayy "little son" (اِبْن ibn "son"); حُسَيْن Ḥusayn "Hussein" (حَسَن ḥasan "good, handsome, beautiful").

Diminutives are relatively unproductive in Modern Standard Arabic, reflecting the fact that they are rare in many modern varieties, e.g. Egyptian Arabic, where they are nearly nonexistent except for a handful of lexicalized adjectives like كُوَيِّس kuwayyis "good", صُغَيَّر ṣuġayyar "small" < Classical صَغِير ṣaġīr "small". On the other hand, they were extremely productive in some of the spoken dialects in Quranic times, and Wright's Arabic grammar lists a large number of diminutives, including numerous exceptional forms. Furthermore, diminutives are enormously productive in some other modern varieties, e.g. Moroccan Arabic. In Moroccan Arabic, nearly every noun has a corresponding diminutive, and they are used quite frequently in speech, typically with an affective value ("cute little X", etc.). The typical diminutive has the Moroccan form fʻila, fʻiyyel, fʻilel or similar – always with two initial consonants and a following /i/, which is the regular outcome of Classical fuʻay-. (fʻila < fuʻaylah; fʻiyyel < fuʻayyal; fʻilel < fuʻaylil.)

== Adverb ==
Adverbials (ظَرْفٌ ẓarf) are expressed using adjectives in the indefinite accusative, often written with the ending ـًا (e.g. أَيْضًا ayḍan "also") but pronounced "-an" even if it's not written (see accusative), e.g.: قَرَأَ ٱلْكِتَابَ قِرَاءَةً بَطِيئَةً qaraʼa al-kitāba qirāʼatan baṭīʼatan, literally: "he read the book a slow reading"; i.e., "He read the book slowly". This type of construction is known as the "absolute accusative" (cf. absolute ablative in Latin syntax).

Adverbs can be formed from adjectives, ordinal numerals: كَثِيرًا kaṯīran "frequently, a lot, often", نَادِرًا nādiran "rarely", أَوَّلاً ʼawwalan "firstly" or from nouns: عَادَةً ʻādatan "usually", جِدًا ǧiddan "very".

The second method to form adverbs is to use a preposition and a noun, e.g. بِـ bi-, e.g. بِسُرْعَةٍ bi-surʻa(tin) "swift, with speed", بِٱلضَّبْطِ bi-ḍ-ḍabṭ(i) "exactly".
