= Deadjectival verb =

Type of verb derived from an adjective

A deadjectival verb is a type of verb derived from an adjective. In English, the verb may be created by adding a suffix to the adjective (for example, intense (A)+ -ify (Verbalizer) → intensify), or a prefix to the adjective (for example, en- + large → enlarge).
