= Elative (gradation) =

Comparative or superlative in Semitic languages

In Semitic linguistics, the elative (Arabic: اِسْمُ تَفْضِيل ismu tafḍīl, literally meaning "noun of preference") is a stage of gradation that can be used to express comparatives or superlatives. The Arabic elative has a special inflection similar to that of colour and defect adjectives but differs in the details. To form an elative, the consonants of the adjective's root are placed in the transfix ’aCCaC (or ’aCaCC if the second and third root consonants are the same), which generally inflects for case but not for gender or number. Furthermore, elatives belong to the diptote declension. E.g. صغير ṣaghīr 'small' derives the elative أصغر ’aṣghar 'smaller', جديد jadīd 'new' derives أجد ’ajadd 'newer', غني ghanī 'rich' (root gh-n-y) derives أغنى ’aghnā 'richer'.

However, there are several words that have particular feminine and plural forms when the elative is prefixed with the definite article, although the agreement is not always observed in modern usage. The feminine singular in such cases takes the transfix CuCCā, the masculine plural takes ’aCCaCūna or ’aCāCiC, and the feminine plural takes CuCCayāt or CuCaC. These feminine and plural forms had much more extensive use in ancient poetry. E.g. The adjective كبير kabīr 'big' changes to أكبر ’akbar in the default elative, and then كبرى kubrā in the feminine singular, أكابر ’akābir in the masculine plural and كبريات kubrayāt in the feminine plural.

The adjectives آخر ’āḫar 'other' and أول ’awwal 'first' also take elative forms even though they do not have comparative meaning.
