= Mein Kampf in Arabic =

Arabic translations of Adolf Hitler's book

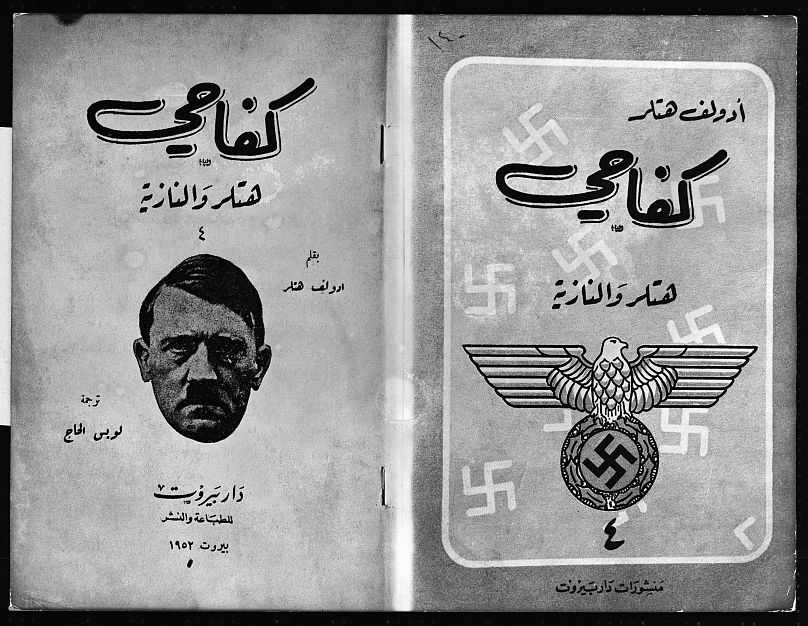
A 1952 Arabic edition of Mein Kampf translated by Louis al-Hajj and published by Dar Beirut.

There have been numerous efforts to translate Adolf Hitler's 1925 autobiography and political manifesto Mein Kampf into Arabic, usually under the title Kifāḥī (كفاحي, Arabic pronunciation: [ki.faː.ħiː], lit. 'My Struggle'). Early efforts were deemed to be poor translations and included only excerpts of the original editions in German. No official Nazi translation into Arabic was ever completed, but unauthorized versions have been sold in kiosks throughout the Arab world.

Although the Nazi Party sought to appeal to Arabs through propaganda, Mein Kampf was not prominent in Nazi propaganda directed at the Arab world. An initial obstacle to an official translation into Arabic was that Hitler's notions of race and antisemitism in the book encompassed anti-Arab racism. According to Jeffrey Herf, in Mein Kampf Hitler's notion of antisemitism was broad and "extended to the non-Jewish Semites of the Arab, Persian, and Muslim world." In meetings between 1936 and 1937, officials from the Nazi Foreign Ministry, Ministry of Propaganda, and Office of Racial Policy had to refine their definition of antisemitism and decided that Nazi race laws distinguished between Germans and Jews, not between Aryans and non-Aryans.

== During Nazi Germany era ==
=== Early translations ===
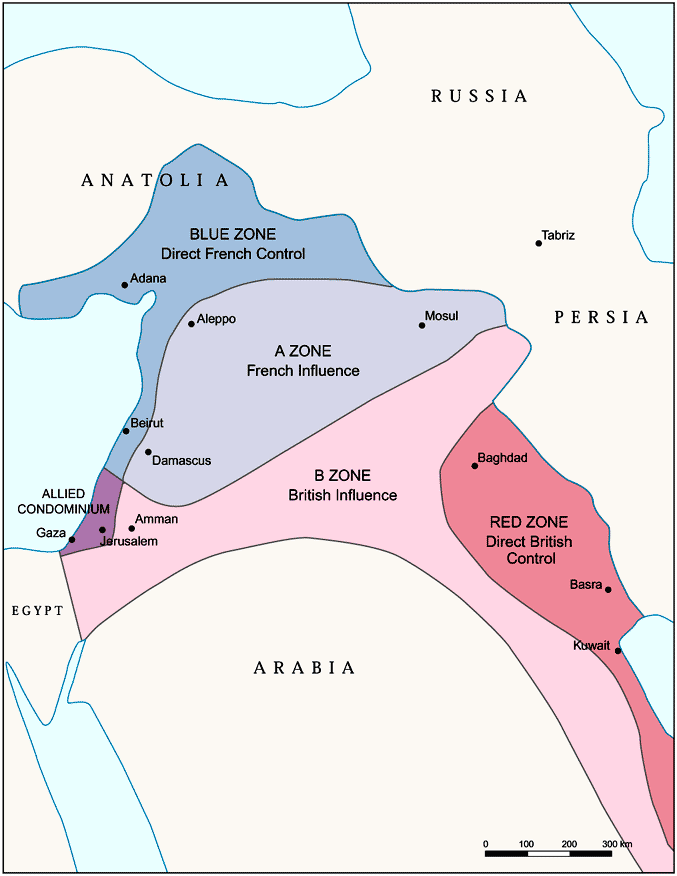
Hitler's stance against France and Britain was appealing to Arab nationalists opposed to French and British colonial influence. A popular slogan in Damascus and Aleppo went "No more Monsieur, no more Mister; Allah in heaven and on earth, Hitler."

On October 21, 1933, Yunus al-Sabawi published his translations of excerpts of Mein Kampf in Iraqi newspaper al-Alam al-Arabi, alarming the local Baghdad Jewish community. Whether the Nazi regime would allow a translation ultimately depended on Hitler's approval. Fritz Grobba, the German ambassador to the Kingdom of Iraq, informed the foreign office in Berlin of the translations and advocated for turning the extracts into a book and for Germany to financially support the project.

The book's anti-Arab racism posed a challenge. Grobba suggested modifying the text "in ways that correspond to the sensitivities of the race conscious Arabs", such as changing "anti-Semitic" to "anti-Jewish", "bastardized" to "dark", and toning down arguments for the supremacy of the "Aryan race". Though Hitler initially resisted modifications, he accepted the Arabic changes on November 12, 1936. Grobba sent 117 clippings from al-Sabawi's translations, but Bernhard Moritz, an Arabist consultant for the German Government who was also fluent in Arabic, said the proposed translation was incomprehensible and rejected it, ending this particular attempt.

Around the same time, Lebanese newspaper Al Nida published extracts from Mein Kampf in early 1934. Though the German consulate was not in contact with the paper, it reported favorably on the development. Editor Kamil Muruwa sought to publish a full translation and requested financial support from the German government. The outcome remains unclear, as the consulate viewed potential Arab contacts in the Levant as unreliable.

In 1935, Umar Abu Nasr independently published a 108-page book of partial Mein Kampf translations in Beirut, separate from Al Nida. While the consulate considered this book, titled Hitler's Struggle, a glorification of Hitler's life, a later publication was described as "an inferior piece of workmanship". The second book was called Hitler, the Terrible or The Police of the Dreadful Politician (Note: This might be an awkward translation, since another source calls the second book "Hitler the Terror: His political Police"). Historian Stefan Wild uses the lack of official German reaction to Abu Nasr's translation to speculate that it was not favorable to Hitler, though copies did reach Tetuan in Morocco.

=== Egyptian edition ===
Subsequently, the German Ministry of Propaganda ordered a translation through the German bookshop Overhamm in Cairo. One translator was Ahmad Mahmud al-Sadati, a Muslim who had published one of the first Arabic books on National Socialism, "Adolf Hitler, za'im al-ishtirakiya al-waṭaniya ma' al-bayan lil-mas'ala al-yahudiya." ("Adolf Hitler, leader of National Socialism, together with an explanation of the Jewish question."). When the manuscript was presented for review in 1937, Moritz once again rejected it as incomprehensible. Sadati's book was published without his permission and received limited circulation.

Another Arabic translation by Ali Muhammad Mahbub contained fewer than 200 octavo pages of actual translation. This translation was extremely poor. For example, it translated "Ich wurde Nationalist" into "innani asbahtu ishtirakiyyan" ("I become a Nationalist" vs "I became a Socialist").

This translation caused a big stir Egypt, as the paper Ruz al Yusuf reported that the translation missed a passage which implied that Arabs were racially inferior, specifically this section of Mein Kampf, :

Genau so kümmerlich sind die Hoffnungen auf den sagenhaften Aufstand in Ägypten. Der "Heilige Krieg" kann unseren deutschen Schafkopfspielern das angenehme Gruseln bringen, daß jetzt andere für uns zu verbluten bereit sind - denn diese feige Spekulation ist, ehrlich gesagt, schon immer der stille Vater solcher Hoffnungen gewesen -, in der Wirklichkeit würde er unter dem Strichfeuer englischer Maschinengewehrkompanien und dem Hagel von Bristolbomben ein höllisches Ende nehmen. Es ist eben eine Unmöglichkeit, einen mächtigen Staat, der entschlossen ist, für seine Existenz, wenn nötig, den letzten Blutstropfen einzusetzen, durch eine Koalition von Krüppeln zu besiegen. Als völkischer Mann, der den Wert des Menschentums nach rassischen Grundlagen abschätzt, darf ich schon aus der Erkenntnis der rassischen Minderwertigkeit dieser sogenannten "unterdrückten Nationen" die Unmöglichkeit des eigenen Volkes mit dem ihren verketten.

The Germans Legation protested in a formal note to the Egyptian foreign ministry, demanding that all copies of the book be removed from the market. The above passage embarrassed the Nazis, and Mahbub's book contained an excerpt from Stephen Roberts' book The House That Hitler Built, which was critical of Hitler, though the Germans ultimately decided to take no action.

In Egypt, Hamid Maliji, an Egyptian attorney, wrote:

Arab friends:...The Arabic copies of Mein Kampf distributed in the Arab world do not conform to the original German edition since the instructions given to Germans regarding us have been removed. In addition, these excerpts do not reveal his [Hitler's] true opinion of us. Hitler asserts that Arabs are an inferior race, that the Arabic heritage has been pillaged from other civilizations, and that Arabs have neither culture nor art, as well as other insults and humiliations that he proclaims concerning us.

Egyptian magazine al-Risala stated that "it was Hitler's tirades in Mein Kampf that turned anti-Semitism into a political doctrine and a program for action". al-Risala rejected Nazism in many publications.

On October 20, 1938, the Arabic translation was put on sale in Jerusalem, with many copies distributed for free to the Arab population. This edition omitted the passage ranking Arabs as 14th on the "racial scale."

=== Attempts at revision ===
A German diplomat in Cairo suggested that instead of deleting the offending passage about Arabs, it would be better to add to the introduction a statement that "Egyptian people 'were differentially developed and that the Egyptians standing at a higher level themselves do not want to be placed on the same level with their numerous backward fellow Egyptians.'" Otto von Hentig, a staff member of the German foreign ministry, suggested that the translation should be rewritten in a style "that every Muslim understands: the Koran," to give it a more sacred tone. He said that "a truly good Arabic translation would meet with extensive sympathy in the whole Arabic speaking world from Morocco to India." Eventually, the translation was sent to Arab nationalism advocate Shakib Arslan. Arslan, who lived in Geneva, Switzerland, was an editor of La Nation arabe, an influential Arab nationalist paper. He also was a confidant of Haj Amin al-Husseini, a Palestinian Arab nationalist and Muslim leader in the British Mandate of Palestine, who met with Hitler.

Arslan's 960-page translation was almost completed when the Germans requested to calculate the cost of the first 10,000 copies to be printed with "the title and back of the flexible cloth binding... lettered in gold." On 21 December 1938, the project was rejected by the German Ministry of Propaganda because of the high cost of the projected publication.

The German Arabist Hans Wehr, a member of the Nazi party and leader of an Arabic–German translation dictionary project that led to the publication of Arabisches Wörterbuch für die Schriftsprache der Gegenwart (1952), believed the Nazi government should ally with the Arabs against England and France. The dictionary project was funded by the Nazi government, which intended to use it to translate Mein Kampf into Arabic. Hedwig Klein, a German-Jewish Arabist, was among the scholars who contributed to the project. Despite her contributions, Klein was murdered in Auschwitz in 1942.

There was also a pamphlet published in 1939 by Abder-Rahmane Fitrawe called Le racisme et l'Islam ("Racism and Islam") which consisted of political cartoons to alert the Muslim community of Algeria of Nazism and fascism, along with excerpts of Mein Kampf in both Arabic and French.

== Later 20th century ==
=== Suez Crisis ===
In a speech to the United Nations immediately following the Suez Crisis in 1956, Israeli Foreign Minister Golda Meir claimed that the Arabic translation of Mein Kampf was found in Egyptian soldiers' knapsacks. In the same speech she also described Gamal Abdel Nasser as a "disciple of Hitler who was determined to annihilate Israel". Arabic kitbag editions entitled Mein Kampf by Hitler, Hitler and Nazism were found among personal possessions of some Egyptian officers captured by Israeli during the crisis. The editions, published by the Beirut Printing and Publishing House in 1952, 1954, and 1955 and translated by Louis el Haj, included extracts of Mein Kampf and photographs of Hitler and Nazi rallies in Nuremberg. British undersecretary of war Julian Amery stated on 12 February 1957 that while British troops found no Arabic copies, Mein Kampf "seemed to have been in fairly general circulation among officers of the Egyptian Army."

=== Louis al-Hajj translation ===
Louis al-Hajj published a translation from French into Arabic of fragments of the book in 1963. Some authors claim that al-Hajj was a Nazi war criminal originally named Luis Heiden who fled to Egypt after World War II. However, Arabic sources and more recent publications identify him as a translator and writer from Lebanon, who later became the editor in chief of the newspaper al-Nahar (النَّهار) in Beirut.

=== 1995 edition ===
The Louis al-Hajj edition was republished in 1995 by Bisan Publishers in Beirut.

As of 2002, news dealers on Edgware Road in central London, an area with a large Arab population, were selling the translation. In 2005, the Intelligence and Terrorism Information Center, an Israeli think tank, confirmed the continued sale of the Bisan edition in bookstores in Edgware Road. In 2007, an Agence France-Presse reporter interviewed a bookseller at the Cairo International Book Fair who stated that he had sold many copies of Mein Kampf.

== Gaza war ==
In an interview with the BBC on November 11, 2023, during the Gaza war, President Isaac Herzog claimed to have obtained an Arabic copy of Mein Kampf from Gaza. IDF soldiers reported finding it in a children's room in Gaza, used as a base by Hamas fighters. The contents of the book included notes in Arabic written in marker. Marc Owen Jones, an associate professor at Hamad Bin Khalifa University, characterized the supposed finding of Mein Kampf in Gaza as "an attempt to bolster the narrative that Palestinian children are being filled with hate, are beyond redemption and are thus valid targets for killing."

In 2024, the IDF claimed to have found copies of Mein Kampf in Arabic.

During a raid on a Hamas-affiliated charity in Hebron in October 2025, IDF forces reportedly discovered Arabic copies of Adolf Hitler’s Mein Kampf alongside evidence of financial ties to Hamas.

== Legacy ==
One of the leaders of the Syrian Ba'ath Party, Sami al-Jundi, wrote of his school days in Damascus 1939 : "We were racialists, admiring Nazism, reading its books and the source of its thought... We were the first to think of translating Mein Kampf." (Note: There were already translations of Mein Kampf by this time.)

According to Jeffrey Herf, "To be sure, the translations of Hitler's Mein Kampf and The Protocols of the Elders of Zion into Arabic were important sources of the diffusion of Nazi ideology and anti-Semitic conspiracy thinking to Arab and Muslim intellectuals. Although both texts were available in various Arabic editions before the war began, they played little role in the Third Reich's Arab propaganda." Herf argues that it was the 'selective appropriation and interpretation' of the Quran that was the most important in Nazi propaganda for the Arab and Muslim world.

After the Suez Crisis, David Ben-Gurion likened Nasser's Philosophy of the Revolution to Hitler's Mein Kampf, a comparison also made by French Prime Minister Guy Mollet, though Time at the time discounted this comparison as "overreaching". "Seen from Washington and New York, Nasser was not Hitler and Suez was not the Sinai," writes Philip Daniel Smith, dismissing the comparison. According to Benny Morris, however, Nasser had not publicly called for the destruction of Israel until after the war, but other Egyptian politicians preceded him in this regard. The second generation of Israeli history textbooks included a photograph of Hitler's Mein Kampf found at Egyptian posts during the war. Elie Podeh writes that the depiction is "probably genuine", but that it "served to dehumanize Egypt (and especially Nasser) by associating it with the Nazis."

== See also ==
- Antisemitism in Islam
- Antisemitism in the Arab world
- Contemporary imprints of The Protocols of the Elders of Zion
- History of the Jews under Muslim rule
- Mein Kampf in English
- Persecution of Jews in the Muslim world
- Relations between Nazi Germany and the Arab world

== Sources ==
- Wild, Stefan (1985). "National Socialism in the Arab near East between 1933 and 1939". Die Welt des Islams. 25 (1): 126–173. JSTOR 1571079 – via JSTOR.
- Wild, Stefan (1964). ""Mein Kampf" in arabischer Übersetzung" ["Mein Kampf" in Arabic translation]. Die Welt des Islams (in German). 9 (1/4). Brill: 207–211. doi:10.2307/1570431. ISSN 0043-2539. JSTOR 1570431 – via JSTOR.
- Herf, Jeffery (2009). Nazi Propaganda for the Arab World. Yale University Press. ISBN 9780300155839.
- Herf, Jeffrey (December 2009b). "Nazi Germany's Propaganda Aimed at Arabs and Muslims During World War II and the Holocaust: Old Themes, New Archival Findings". Central European History. 42 (4): 709–736. doi:10.1017/S000893890999104X. ISSN 0008-9389.
- Nordbruch, Götz (2009). Nazism in Syria and Lebanon: The Ambivalence of the German Option, 1933–1945. Routledge. ISBN 9780415457149.
