= Arabic-Hebrew Dictionary =

1947 Arabic-Hebrew dictionary

Arabic-Hebrew Dictionary מלון ערבי–עברי
- Author: David Neustadt (later David Ayalon); Pessah Schusser (later Pessah Shinar)
- Language: Hebrew, Arabic
- Genre: translation dictionary
- Published: 1947
- Publisher: Press Association, Hebrew University of Jerusalem
- Publication place: Mandatory Palestine
- Pages: ix + 434

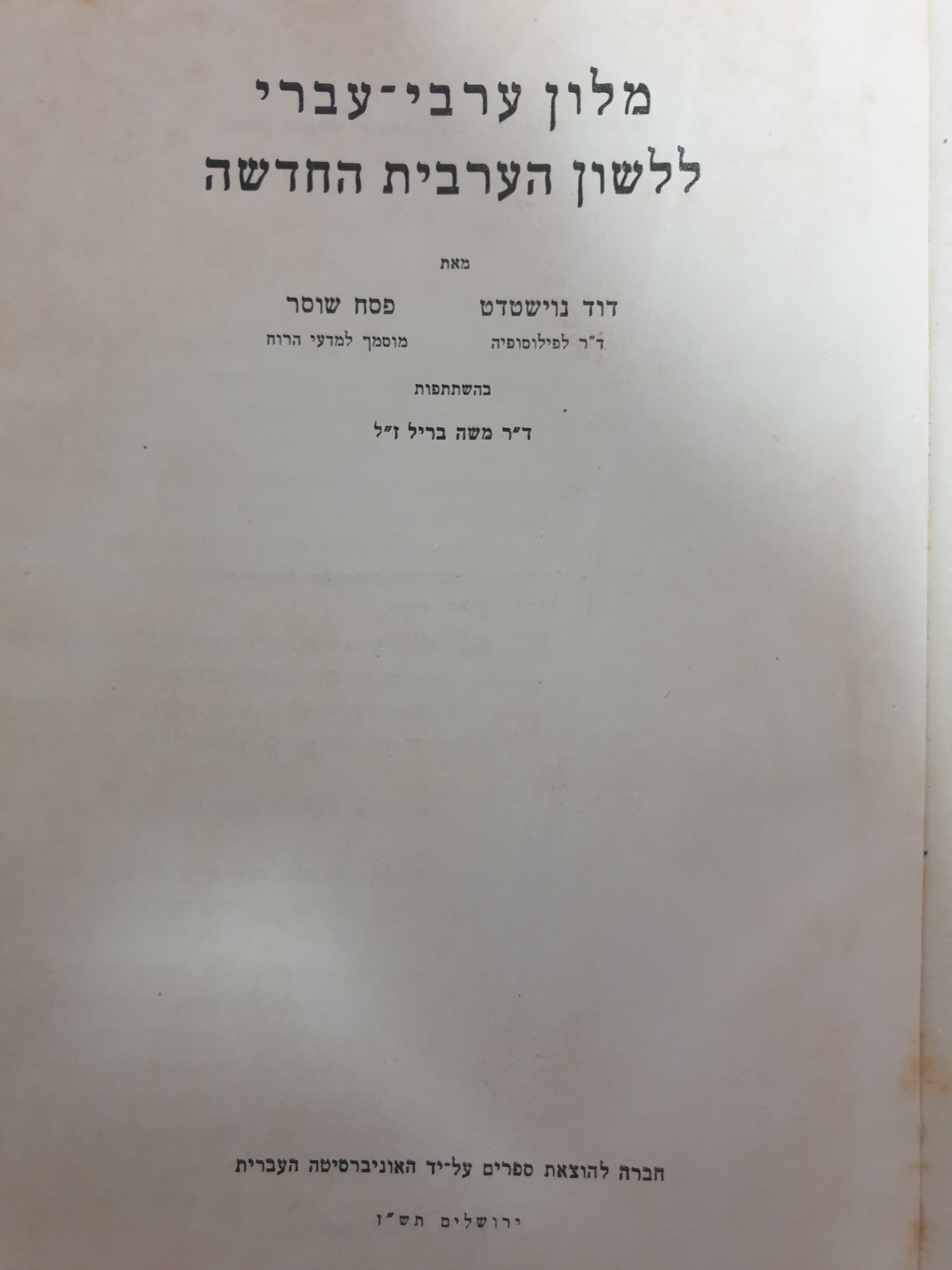
Cover of the Arabic-Hebrew Dictionary

The Arabic-Hebrew Dictionary (Hebrew: מלון ערבי–עברי Millōn 'Arabi-'Ibri) is a translation dictionary of Arabic and Hebrew compiled by David Neustadt (later David Ayalon) and Pessah Schusser (later Pessah Shinar) and published in Jerusalem, Mandatory Palestine by the Hebrew University Press Association in 1947.

== History ==
According to Solomon Skoss, it was a supplement of a project entitled The basic word list of the Arabic daily newspaper elaborated by the same two authors as well as Moshe Brill and published by the Hebrew University Press in 1940. This earlier project sought to identify the most frequently occurring words in Arabic newspapers for the purposes of assisting teachers and textbook writers for secondary schools and evening classes for the Jewish community in Palestine.

The Arabic-Hebrew Dictionary covered, primarily, the most frequently used words in Arabic newspapers published in Egypt, Palestine, Lebanon, and Iraq, according to statistical analysis. The authors found that about 3,000 Arabic words accounted for 94.8% of all words counted in Arabic daily newspapers. In addition, Arabic-Hebrew Dictionary contains material from modern Arabic literature and periodicals, focusing on terminology used in political, economic and social sciences. Members of the faculty of the Institute of Oriental Studies (later the Institute of Asian and African Studies) at Hebrew University provided assistance with terminology relevant to their respective fields.

The dictionary was compiled at a time of intercommunal conflict in Mandatory Palestine. One of the two authors served in the army, at which time a certain graduate of the Institute of Oriental Studies named Mr. A. Greenblatt assisted with the preparation of the dictionary.

Hans Wehr stated that he consulted the Arabic-Hebrew Dictionary as a secondary source in compiling material for the 1959 Supplement to his Dictionary of Modern Written Arabic.
