= Arabist =

Specialist in Arabic language and literature

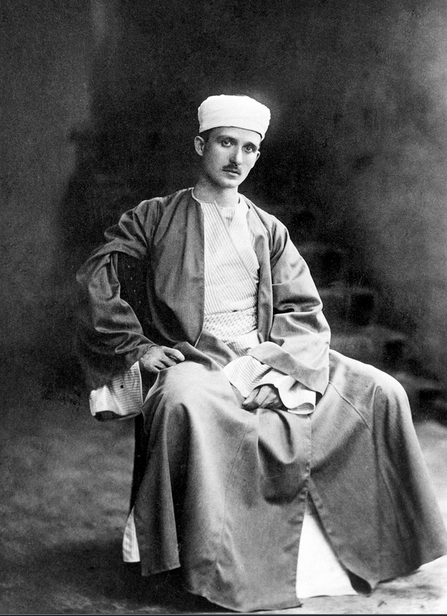
French Arabist Louis Massignon in Cairo

An Arabist is someone, often but not always from outside the Arab world, who specialises in the study of the Arabic language and culture (usually including Arabic literature).

== Origins ==
Arabists began in medieval Muslim Spain, which lay on the frontier between the Muslim world and Christendom. At various times, either a Christian or a Muslim kingdom might be the most hospitable toward scholars. Translation of Arabic texts into Latin (mostly of works on mathematics and astronomy) began as early as the 10th century, major works date from the School of Toledo, which began during the reign of Alfonso VII of Castile, (1105–1157).

Translations were made into medieval Latin or Church Latin, then Europe's lingua franca, or into medieval Spanish, which was the vernacular language of that time and place. Early translations included works by Avicenna, Al-Ghazali, Avicebron, etc.; books on astronomy, astrology, and medicine; and the works of some of the Ancient Greek philosophers, especially Aristotle, who unlike Plato had previously been relatively unknown, forbidden, and largely ignored in European Christendom. The philosophical translations were accompanied by the Islamic commentaries, e.g., on Al-Ghazali, Ibn Sina (Avicenna), and Ibn Rushd (Averroës), to the point of there being an identifiable Averroist school of philosophy in Christian Europe.

This cultural borrowing from the Arab culture enjoyed the strong patronage of Alfonso X of Castile (1221–1284), who commissioned translations of major works into the Latin and the Castilian Spanish of the time. This led to the first Spanish translation of the Qur'an, and of such influential works as Calila e Dimna, Libro de los juegos (Book of games), The Tablas Alfonsíes (Alfonsine Tables), El Libro de los Enganos e los Asayamientos de las Mugeres (The Book of the Wiles of Women), and La escalera de Muhammad (Book of Muhammad's Ladder).

The works of Alfonso X in history and astronomy drew on numerous elements of Muslim knowledge. Also, the Tales of Count Lucanor, by Juan Manuel and El Libro de buen amor (The Book of Good Love) by Arcipreste de Hita from this period both show an interpenetration and symbiosis of Oriental and Spanish cultures.

== Arabists and the Reconquista ==
With the Reconquista well under way, Arabist efforts in Spain were sometimes closely tied to the goal of the possibility of proselytizing Christianity in the Arab world.

Spain was so dynamic a center of medieval Arabism as to draw scholars from throughout Christian Europe, notably Gerard of Cremona, Herman of Carinthia, Michael Scotus, and Robert of Ketton. In 1143, Robert of Ketton made the first Latin translation of the Qur'an, at the request of Peter the Venerable, abbot of Cluny. Mark of Toledo produced another translation of the Qur'an in the 13th century under a mandate from archbishop Rodrigo Ximénez de Rada, who later edited the landmark Historia Arabum ("history of the Arabs"), drawing on the work of al-Razi for the knowledge of al-Andalus prior to the Almoravid conquest.

This trend continued in the 15th century, with Juan de Segovia's trilingual Qur'an (Arabic, Spanish, and Latin), now lost, and Cardinal Cisneros's Complutensian Polyglot Bible. In the 16th century, Pedro de Alcalá produced his Arabic primers for Spanish speakers, and several histories were written about the previous century's reconquest of the Emirate of Granada with its aftermath of Moorish uprisings.

== Eclipse and renewal of Spanish Arabists ==
As Arabism was declining in Europe after the Reformation, this was also the case in Spain for like reasons, and due in particular to Mediterranean politics and to the repressive atmosphere created by the Spanish Inquisition. Some Moriscos hesitated to show their knowledge of their mother tongue. In the mid-18th century a new phase of Arabism arose in Spain. Later, in the era of the Generación del 98 Spanish Arabism began to produce widely recognized studies, and thus regained its prominence, particularly regarding such Arabists as Miguel Asín Palacios (1871–1944), and Emilio García Gómez (1905–1995), as well as many others.

== Arabists in Europe ==
In England, Robert of Chester translated many books from Arabic into Latin during the 12th Century, including works from scholars such as Abu Musa Jabir Ibn Hayyan and Al-Khwarizmi. The Adams Professorship in the Arabic language was established at Cambridge University in England in July 1632. The Laudian Professorship in Arabic was established at Oxford University in 1636.

Italy, France, Germany, and the Netherlands have enjoyed a long and fruitful involvement in the study of the Arabic language and Arab cultures, as well of Islam, with scholars like Levinus Warner and Joseph Scaliger. Many other European countries have also produced scholars who have made notable contributions to the study of the Arabs and Arabic cultures, including Sweden, Czech Republic, Poland, Scotland, Romania, Hungary, Belgium, and Russia.

=== Richard Francis Burton ===
Richard Francis Burton entered Trinity College, Oxford in autumn 1840, after his family had travelled extensively in Europe (he spoke English, French and Italian). His studies at Oxford included falconry and Arabic.

Burton's time in the Pakistani province of Sindh prepared him well for the transgressive pilgrimage to Mecca and Medina that he undertook in 1853 (he was not a Muslim and non-Muslims are forbidden to enter these holy cities). Seven years in Pakistan had given Burton a familiarity with the customs and behaviour of Muslims. This journey made Burton famous. He had planned it whilst travelling disguised among the Muslims of Sindh, and had laboriously prepared for the ordeal by study and practice (including having himself circumcised to further lower the risk of being discovered).

Although Burton was not the first non-Muslim European to make the Hajj (that distinction belonging to Ludovico di Barthema in 1503), his pilgrimage is the most famous and the best documented of the time. He adopted various disguises, including that of a Pathan, to account for any oddities in speech, but he still had to master intricate Islamic ritual, and the minutiae of Eastern manners and etiquette. Burton's trek to Mecca was quite dangerous and his caravan was attacked by bandits (a common experience at the time). As he put it, although "...neither Koran or Sultan enjoin the death of Jew or Christian intruding within the columns that note the sanctuary limits, nothing could save a European detected by the populace, or one who after pilgrimage declared himself an unbeliever." The pilgrimage entitled him to the title of Hajji and to wear a green turban. Burton's own account of his journey is given in Personal Narrative of a Pilgrimage to Al Madinah and Meccah (1855).

=== T. E. Lawrence ===
T. E. Lawrence started out as an archaeologist in what is now Syria and Lebanon where he studied Arabic and immersed himself in Arab culture. After joining the British Army with the outbreak of World War I, he became known for his role in the Arab Revolt against Ottoman rule gaining fame as Lawrence of Arabia. He worked closely with the Hashemite dynasty that established independent Arab states in Hejaz, Iraq, Syria, and Jordan after ending Ottoman rule.

Lawrence's heroic reputation was built from his own lively writing skills, sensational reporting by American journalist Lowell Thomas, and later the dramatization of his life in the epic film Lawrence of Arabia.

=== Lady Hester Stanhope ===
Lady Hester Stanhope, after the death of British Prime Minister William Pitt the Younger, to whom she acted as hostess, took up a life of travel. She spent most of her life in the Middle East and was accepted as Queen of the Bedouin.

=== Gertrude Bell ===
Gertrude Bell, was an English writer, traveller, political officer, administrator, archaeologist and spy. She played a major role in establishing and helping administer the modern state of Iraq.

=== St John Philby ===
St John Philby was a British colonial office intelligence officer and King Ibn Sa'ud of Saudi Arabia's chief adviser in dealing with the British Empire and Western oil powers.

=== Hans Wehr ===
Hans Wehr (1909–1981) was a German Arabist, professor at the University of Münster from 1957–1974. Wehr published the Arabisches Wörterbuch (1952), which was later published in an English edition as A Dictionary of Modern Written Arabic, edited by J. Milton Cowan. As part of this dictionary, Wehr created a transliteration scheme to represent the Arabic alphabet.

== Arabists in the Middle East ==
Some notable Arabists from the Middle East worth mentioning are Haim Zafrani in Morocco, Ahmad Zaki Pasha in Egypt, Tarif Khalidi in Lebanon, Zvi Elpeleg in Israel, Mehmet Hakkı Suçin in Turkey and William Duff.

== See also ==
- Islam
- Islamic studies by author (non-Muslim or academic)
- Orientalism
- Middle Eastern studies

== Bibliography ==
- Teresa Fava Thomas. American Arabists in the Cold War Middle East, 1946–75: From Orientalism to Professionalism. NY-London: Anthem Press, 2016.
