= A Dictionary of Modern Written Arabic =

Arabic–English dictionary compiled by Hans Wehr

- Hans Wehr's Dictionary of Modern Written Arabic, 1976 English-language U.S. edition
- Author: Hans Wehr
- Translator: J Milton Cowan
- Genre: Translation dictionary
- Published: 1952 (German: Arabisches Wörterbuch für die Schriftsprache der Gegenwart); 1959 (German supplement: Supplement zum arabischen Wörterbuch für die Schriftsprache der Gegenwart)
- English publication date: 1961 (Otto Harrassowitz: A Dictionary of Modern Written Arabic: Arabic–English); 1976 (Spoken Language Services, Inc: Arabic–English Dictionary: The Hans Wehr Dictionary of Modern Written Arabic, Edited by J M. Cowan)

A Dictionary of Modern Written Arabic (originally published in German as Arabisches Wörterbuch für die Schriftsprache der Gegenwart 'Arabic dictionary for the contemporary written language'), also published in English as The Hans Wehr Dictionary of Modern Written Arabic, is a translation dictionary of modern written Arabic compiled by Hans Wehr. The original Arabic-German dictionary was first published in 1952, with additional materials published in the Supplement zum arabischen Wörterbuch für die Schriftsprache der Gegenwart in 1959. The Arabic-English edition edited by J Milton Cowan, based on the German 1952 edition and the 1959 supplement with revisions and improvements, was published in 1961. The dictionary is based on attestations in written Arabic taken from modern literature, newspapers, and state documents. Its lexical entries are organized according to Arabic root.

The work is compiled on descriptive principles: only words and expressions that are attested in context are included. "It was chiefly based on combing modern works of Arabic literature for lexical items, rather than culling them from medieval Arabic dictionaries, which was what Lane had done in the nineteenth century".

Hans Wehr was a member of the National Socialist (Nazi) Party and argued that the Nazi government should ally with the Arabs against England and France. The Arabic-German dictionary project was funded by the Nazi government, which intended to use it to translate Adolf Hitler's Mein Kampf into Arabic. Despite this, at least one Jewish scholar, Hedwig Klein, contributed to the dictionary.

The English edition was edited by J Milton Cowan and published in 1961 by Otto Harrassowitz in Wiesbaden, Germany. It was an enlarged and revised version of Wehr's original 1952 German edition and its 1959 supplement. The Arabic-German dictionary was completed in 1945, but not published until 1952. Writing in the 1960s, a critic commented, "Of all the dictionaries of modern written Arabic, the work [in question] ... is the best." It remains the most widely used Arabic-English dictionary. Besides English speakers, the dictionary is also very popular among Arabic language learners in Japan.

== History ==
=== First edition (1952) ===
Hans Wehr's German-Arabic translation dictionary Arabisches Wörterbuch für die Schriftsprache der Gegenwart ('Arabic dictionary for the contemporary written language') was first published in 1952.

A group of scholars including Werner Caskel, Hans Kindermann, Hedwig Klein, Kurt Munzel, Annemarie Schimmel, Richard Schmidt, Wolfram von Soden, Muhammad Safti, Tahir Khemiri, Anton Spitaler, Andreas Jacobi, and Heinrich Becker contributed to the project.

==== Corpora ====
The 1952 edition was based on a corpus of approximately 45,000 slips, or textual citations, from Arabic sources. The primary source material included selected works of modern Arabic literature, the authors Taha Hussein, Mohammed Hussein Heikal, Tawfiq al-Hakim, Mahmud Taymur, Mustafa Lutfi al-Manfaluti, Kahlil Gibran, and Ameen Rihani. It also included various Egyptian newspapers and periodicals, as well as the 1935 edition of the Egyptian state almanac, taqwim misr, and the 1937 edition of the Iraqi state almanac, dalil al'iraq.

Secondary sources included Léon Bercher's Lexique arabe-français (1938) based on Tunisian press and in supplement to Jean-Baptiste Belot's Vocabulaire arabe-français, Georges-Séraphin Colin's Pour lire la presse arabe (1937), Elias A. Elias' Modern Dictionary Arabic-English (1929), and the glossary of C.V. Ode-Vassilieva's Modern Arabic Chrestomathy (1929).

=== Supplement (1959) ===
A supplement of additional material compiled after the publication of the first edition was published in the Supplement zum arabischen Wörterbuch für die Schriftsprache der Gegenwart in 1959.

Eberhard Kuhnt, Götz Schregle, and Karl Stowasser provided contributions to the Supplement.

==== Corpora ====
The Supplement contained citations from primary source material selected from the writings of Abd al-Salam al-Ujayli, Mikha'il Nu'ayma, Karam Malham Karam, as well as newspapers and periodicals from all Arab countries.

Secondary source material considered in preparing the Supplement included later editions of Bercher and Elias and David Neustadt and Pessar Schusser's Arabic-Hebrew Dictionary (Millón 'Arabi-' Ibri, 1947), Charles Pellat's L'arabe vivant (1952), and C.K. Baranov's Arabic-Russian Dictionary (арабско-русского словаря 'Arabsko-Russkiy Slovar,' 1957).

=== English edition (1961) ===
Shortly after the publication of the first German version in 1952, the Committee on Language Programs of the American Council of Learned Societies recognized its excellence and sought to publish an English version. The publication of the English edition was financed by the American Council of Learned Societies, the Arabian-American Oil Company, and Cornell University.

The English version of the Wehr dictionary It was an enlarged and revised version of Wehr's original 1952 German edition and its 1959 supplement. It is commonly available in two editions. The so-called 3rd edition was printed by Otto Harrassowitz in Wiesbaden, Hesse, in 1961 (reprinted in 1966, 1971) under the title A Dictionary of Modern Written Arabic: Arabic–English, as well as by Spoken Language Services, Inc. of Ithaca, New York, in 1976, under the somewhat different title Arabic–English Dictionary: The Hans Wehr Dictionary of Modern Written Arabic, Edited by J M. Cowan. Librairie du Liban in Lebanon has printed it since 1980, and it is widely available in the region (ISBN 978-9953-33-673-2).

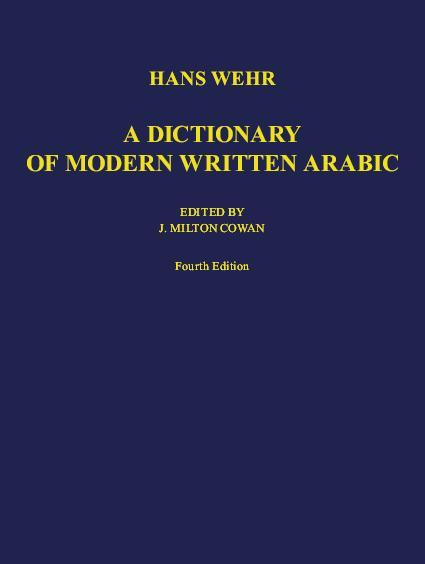
The 4th edition in English published by Harrassowitz Verlag in 1979

The 4th edition, which is considerably amended and enlarged (1301 pages compared to 1110 in the 3rd edition), was published in 1979. Harrassowitz published an improved English translation of the 4th edition of the Arabic-German dictionary with over 13,000 additional entries, approx. 26,000 words with approx. 20 words per page. It was published in 1994 by Spoken Language Services, Inc. of Ithaca, New York, and is usually available in the United States as a compact "student" paperback (ISBN 0-87950-003-4). In 2019, a two-volume version also started being offered.

The 5th edition available in German, published by Harrassowitz's publishing house in 1985, also in the city of Wiesbaden, under the title Arabisches Wörterbuch für die Schriftsprache der Gegenwart: Arabisch–Deutsch, unter Mitwirkung von Lorenz Kropfitsch neu bearbeitet und erweitert (ISBN 3-447-01998-0). It has 1452 pages of dictionary entries.

The 6th edition in German was published by Harrassowitz in December 2020 on the basis of the former, significantly expanded and comprehensively edited by Lorenz Kropfitsch, yet shrunk to 1040 pages in a less bulky volume due to newer publishing techniques. The Arabist and lexicographer Dr. Lorenz Kropfitsch, who taught Arabic at the FTSK Germersheim for decades, died on January 5, 2020, at the age of 73.

== Collation ==
The dictionary arranges its entries according to the traditional Arabic root order. Foreign words are listed in straight alphabetical order by the letters of the word. Arabicized loanwords, if they can clearly fit under some root, are entered both ways, often with the root entry giving reference to the alphabetical listing.

Under a given root, lexical data are, whenever they exist, arranged in the following sequence:

- the perfect of the basic stem (stem I)
- vowels of the imperfect of stem I
- maṣādir (verbal nouns) of stem I
- finite derived stem verb forms, indicated by Roman numerals

Nominal forms then follow according to their length (including those verbal nouns and participles which merit separate listings). This ordering means that forms derived from the same verb stem (i.e. closely related finite verb forms, verbal nouns, and participles) are not always grouped together (as is done in some other Arabic dictionaries). The dictionary does not usually give concrete example forms of finite derived stem verbs, so that the user must refer to the introduction in order to know the pattern associated with each of the stem numbers ("II" through "X") and reconstruct such verb forms based solely on the stem number and the abstract consonantal root.

== Transcription and orthography ==
Transcriptions (for specific details, see Hans Wehr transliteration) are provided for the past tense of the basic verb form, for the vowel of the imperfect tense, and for all nouns and particles, but they are not provided for verb forms of the derived stems, except for any irregular forms, the rare XI to XV stems, and the quadriliteral roots. The morphology of the derived stems II-X is regular and is given in Wehr's "Introduction". Other parts of speech such as nouns are fully given transcriptions.

Foreign words are transliterated according to pronunciation, for which Arab students at the University of Münster were consulted. This means that the sounds [e], [eː], [ə], [o], [oː], [ɡ], [v], and [p], which are used in Modern Standard Arabic pronunciation among well-educated and careful speakers, but cannot be easily represented in standard Arabic script (even with full vowel diacritics), can be unambiguously indicated. Examples would be مانجو mangō 'mango fruit/tree' and كوري kōrī 'Korean'.

As for the Arabic orthography used, word-initial glottal stops or hamza (i.e. the ا vs. أ vs. إ distinction) are not written either in the Arabic of the entries or in the transliteration. For example, اكل (transliterated akala, "to eat", from the root أ ك ل ʼ k l), which has an initial hamzat al-qaṭʽ, and ابن (ibn "son", from the root ب ن b-n), which does not have an initial hamzat al-qaṭʽ, are both written without a hamza represented in either the Arabic or the transliteration. In transliteration systems such as DIN 31635, the first would be transliterated as ʼakala, with an apostrophe representing hamza, and the second as ibn, without an apostrophe. Hamzas in the middle and end of words, however, are written, as in مأكل maʼkal "food".

Word-final yā’ ي (-y or -ī) and alif maqṣūra ى (-ā) are not distinguished in the Arabic: they are both written as ى, without dots (an Egyptian custom). They are, however, distinguished in the transliteration: for example, ثنى ("to double") and ثني ("bending") are both written as ثنى, but the first is transliterated as ṯanā and the second as ṯany.

== See also ==
- Classical Arabic
- List of Arabic language academies
- Arabic phonology
- Romanization of Arabic
- Help:IPA/Arabic
- Varieties of Arabic
