= David Ayalon =

Israeli historian

- דוד איילון
- Born: David Neustadt; 1914; Haifa, Ottoman Empire
- Died: 25 June 1998 (aged 84); Jerusalem, Israel
- Scientific career
- Fields: History
- Doctoral advisor: Leo Aryeh Mayer
- Other academic advisors: Shelomo Dov Goitein

David Ayalon (Hebrew: דוד איילון; born David Neustadt, 1914 – 25 June 1998) was an Israeli historian of Islam and the Middle East, specializing in the Mamluk dynasties of Egypt. Within Israel he was best known for the Arabic-Hebrew Dictionary he co-compiled with Pessah Schusser in 1947.

== Life ==
Born David Neustadt in Haifa, he grew up in Zichron Ya'akov and Rosh Pinna. After completing secondary school in Haifa, Ayalon went in 1933 to study at the recently founded Hebrew University in Jerusalem.

Despite service in the British Army during World War II, he gained his PhD in 1946 under the supervision of Leo Aryeh Mayer. In the late 1940s he changed his name to David Ayalon.

Ayalon founded the department of modern Middle East studies there in 1949, and was its head until 1956. From 1963 to 1967 he led the Institute of Asian and African Studies at the Hebrew University.

He contributed articles to the Encyclopedia of Islam. A notable work late in Ayalon's career was Eunuchs, Caliphs and Sultans.

== Death ==
Ayalon died of cancer at 84 in 1998. He was survived by his wife, Professor Myriam Rosen-Ayalon of Hebrew University, a leading authority on Islamic art and archeology.

== Works ==
- (with Pessah Schusser) Arabic-Hebrew Dictionary of Modern Arabic, 1947.
- Gunpowder and firearms in the Mamluk kingdom: a challenge to a mediaeval society, 1956
- Studies on the Mamlūks of Egypt (1250–1517), 1977
- The Mamlūk military society, 1979
- Outsiders in the lands of Islam: Mamluks, Mongols, and eunuchs, 1988
- Islam and the abode of war: military slaves and Islamic adversaries, 1994
- Eunuchs, caliphs and sultans: a study in power relationships, 1999
