= Hedwig Klein =

German Jewish scholar of Arabic and victim of Nazi extermination

- Born: 1911; Antwerp, Belgium
- Died: 11 July 1942 (aged 30–31); Auschwitz concentration camp, German-occupied Poland
- Citizenship: German Reich
- Education: University of Hamburg
- Occupation: Arabist

Hedwig Klein (German pronunciation: [ˈheːtvɪç ˈklaɪn]; 19 February 1911 or 12 September 1911 – after 11 July 1942) was a German Jewish Arabist and scholar, who was later murdered in Auschwitz.

== Biography ==
=== Early life and education ===
Hedwig Klein was born in Antwerp to Abraham Wolff Klein, a Hungarian oil wholesaler, and his wife Recha. She was the couple's second daughter. In 1914, the family moved to Hamburg. Two years later, her father was killed in combat on the Eastern Front during World War I. In January 1927, Hedwig Klein, her mother, and her sister, who was about a year older than Hedwig, became naturalized German citizens.

Klein studied at the Jewish Girls School in Hamburg until 1928, when she joined the Lichtwarkschule. It was here that she completed her Abitur in 1931 and in the same year, she enrolled at the University of Hamburg to study Islamic studies, Semitic studies, and English philology. According to Albert Dietrich, who would later become professor of Arabic, university teachers at Hamburg university were liberal and open-minded people, for whom anti-semitic views were uncommon. For that reason, Klein felt "safe" in her academic department. Dietrich described her as follows:

She was delicate and petite, quite near-sighted, calm, reserved and hopelessly modest. But she had a critical sensibility and she was skeptical of any kind of dogmatic statement. From time to time, she expressed these doubts in her soft voice. This earned her the [...] respectful nickname of shakkāka (شكاكة), or the habitual skeptic, which she received with a smile. [...]

— Peter Freimark, Promotion Hedwig Klein, p. 581

In 1937, Klein completed her PhD dissertation, entitled Geschichte der Leute von 'Omān von ihrer Annahme des Islam bis zu ihrem Dissensus, a critical edition of an Arabic manuscript concerning early Islamic history. She was not initially awarded the PhD because of her Jewish background. When she wrote to the sinologist Fritz Jäger, who was dean of the School of Philosophy, mentioning, that her father had been killed in the war, she was "exceptionally admitted to the PhD degree". Her PhD dissertation received the distinction summa cum laude. Her PhD supervisor Rudolf Strothmann called it "a valuable contribution to Islamic Studies", and his colleague Arthur Schaade remarked that Klein's work was "so diligent and brilliant that it made one wish some older Arabists could live up to it." Klein also passed the Rigorosum with the mark of "excellent". After consulting with the authorities, Jäger however refused to grant the necessary approval to confirm Klein's doctoral degree, claiming that "the situation was deteriorating".

=== Attempted flight ===
After this, Klein decided to leave Germany. Freimark writes, "When she was in a desperate situation, Hedwig Klein received help and support from a man, whose effective and courageous efforts deserve praise and have not yet been recognized." The geographer Carl Rathjens arranged for Klein to receive a job offer in India. She left Hamburg aboard the ship Rauenfels on 19 August 1939. On 21 August 1939, she sent Rathjens a postcard from Antwerp on which she wrote: "In this pleasant weather, I'm feeling good on board the ship and I'm not worried about the future at this moment. No doubt, Allah will help me. I've believed that ever since I had the fortune to meet one of His friends.“

The ship was already running two days late when it made a four-day stopover in Antwerp. Because of the threat of war breaking out, the ship was ordered back to Hamburg. As Freimark writes, "The race to escape […] was lost." Klein returned to her family in Hamburg, where she lived through "all the torture", as Carl Rathjens would later describe it, from having to wear the Judenstern to being forced out of her family apartment into a lodging for Jews (Judenhaus). Rathjens himself spent a month in the Fuhlsbüttel camp in what was called "protective Custody".

=== Collaboration for the Dictionary of Modern Written Arabic ===
Arthur Schaade put Klein in contact with Hans Wehr, who was working on a dictionary of contemporary Arabic, later published as hisDictionary of Modern Written Arabic. Along with other collaborators, Klein reviewed contemporary works of Arabic literature for the dictionary. She wrote the original Arabic words and their translation into German on pieces of paper and sent these to the editorial staff. She received 10 Pfennigs for each word. Wehr's staff praised the "exceptional quality" of Klein's contributions. "Of course, it is simply unimaginable that she will ever receive credit for her contribution", wrote one member of the staff to Arthur Schaade on 8 August 1941.

Reportedly, the main purpose of this dictionary was to help "translate Adolf Hitler's Mein Kampf into Arabic in order to gain the Arab peoples as allies." In her work Victim of the Holocaust. The Tragic Story of Hedwig Klein, however, the Islamic scholar Sabine Schmittke described this as a misinterpretation, since the Arabic dictionary had “nothing to do with Mein Kampf.”

Her work on the Dictionary of Modern Written Arabic saved Klein from a scheduled deportation to Riga in December 1941. Schaade had already written to Nazi officials that "The Wehrmacht and the Kriegspropaganda were highly interested in seeing the work completed", that Klein was "highly qualified" for the work and "the number of available Aryan employees was limited."

=== Deportation to Auschwitz ===
Klein's sister Therese was deported to Riga on 6 December 1941 where she was murdered. Despite Schaade's intervention, Hedwig Klein was deported on 11 July 1942 on the first train that left Hamburg for Auschwitz. Her mother was sent to Theresienstadt four days later. Like her daughter Hedwig, she is considered to have died ("verschollen") in the Auschwitz concentration camp. Hedwig Klein's grandmother died at Theresienstadt in November 1943.

=== Aftermath and legacy ===
When Klein had been deported, Schaade did not give up. In October 1942, he asked his Arabist colleague Adolf Grohmann, who was based in Leitmeritz, to search for the young woman and to hire her as an assistant. Grohmann, who was a Nazi party loyalist, provided no help. Grohmann did not think "that further work for the named person was any longer an option", as he wrote to Schaade on a postcard that bore the imprint "Heil Hitler".

After 1945, Schaade and Rathjens continued their attempts to understand what had happened to Hedwig Klein. At the end of 1945, Rathjens told his former neighbor, the theologian Walter Windfuhr, "It is 100% certain that the first transport [on which Hedwig Klein was deported] was sent directly to Auschwitz. And it was also sent directly to the gas ovens. [...] Just thinking about it makes me cry and fills me with hatred toward the Nazis."

Schaade complained in a letter to one of the staff on the Dictionary of Modern Written Arabic that he had "frequently encouraged Klein for some time" to complete her PhD dissertation and emigrate in good time. In the few surviving letters written by Klein, she connected the issue of emigration to scholarly activity in her discipline, which is why she did not want to emigrate to the United States. According to Freimark, because of Klein's "sheltered lifestyle" she was apparently unable to imagine "the extent and scope of the barbarism" and the existential threat that she faced.

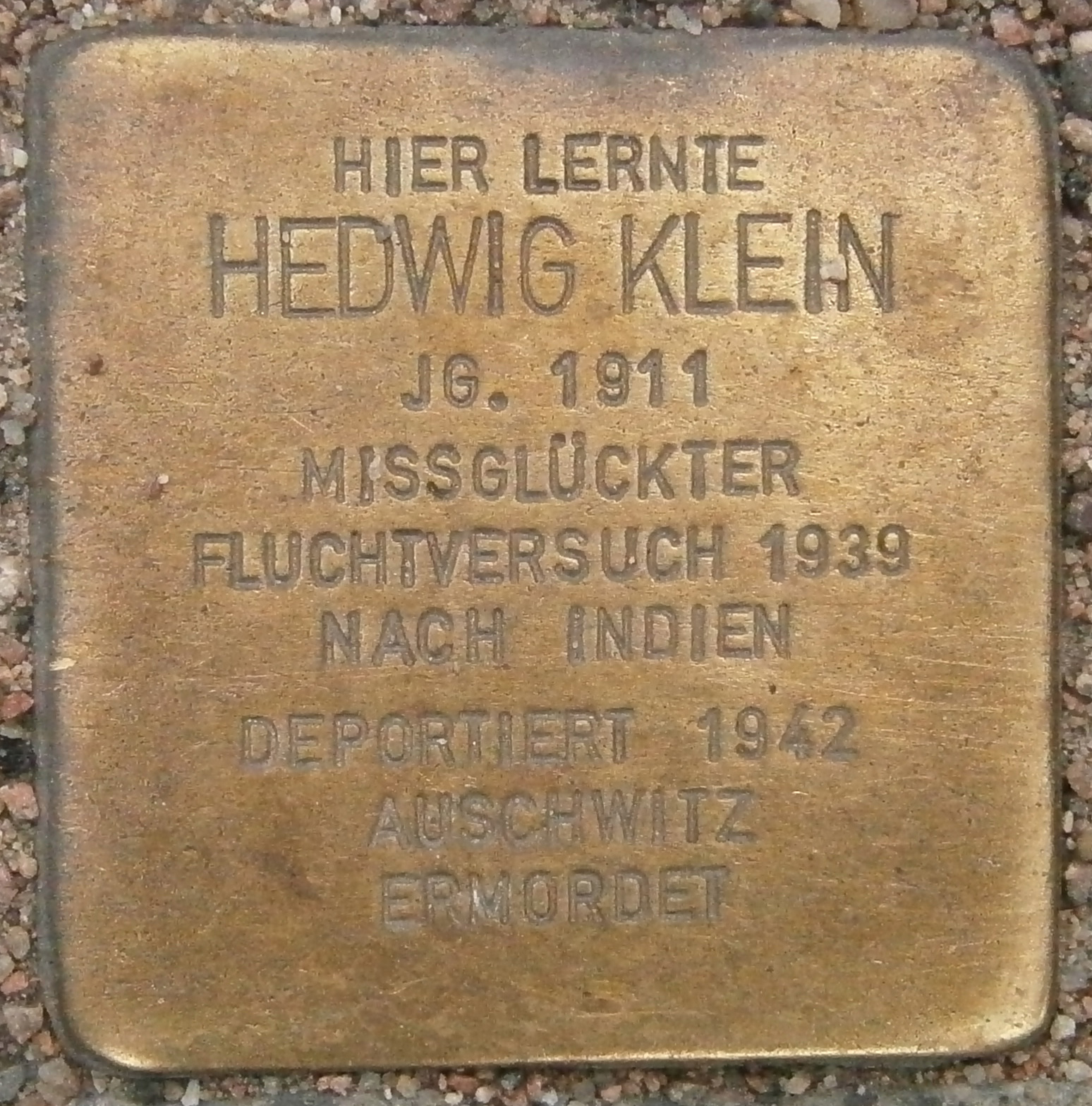
Stolperstein commemorating Hedwig Klein at the University of Hamburg

In order to exonerate himself, Hans Wehr claimed in his De-Nazification after 1945 that he had been able to save "Miss Dr Klein from Hamburg" from deportation by recruiting her for "work that was critical to the war effort", i.e. the Dictionary of Modern Written Arabic. When the dictionary was published in 1952, Wehr thanked "Miss Dr Klein" for her contribution in the foreword, but he did not mention what happened to her. The fifth edition of the dictionary was published in 2011 and it, too, failed to include any mention of Klein's murder. In the 6th edition published in 2020, the foreword mentioned the information about Klein's death in Auschwitz in 1942.

"In an act of remembrance that was uncharacteristic for its time", Carl Rathjens petitioned the Amtsgericht Hamburg in the summer of 1947 to appoint him to be Hedwig Klein's representative in absentia (Abwesenheitspfleger). He had 56 copies of Klein's PhD dissertation printed and on 15 August 1947, Klein was officially declared a Doctor of Philosophy. In 1951, through Carl Rathjens's efforts, she was declared dead.

On 22 April 2010, Stolpersteine bearing the names of Hedwig Klein and other murdered Jewish academics were placed outside the main buildings of the University of Hamburg. Another Stolperstein with her name and fate was placed outside her last known address in the Harvestehude district of Hamburg.

== Sources ==
- Ekkehard Ellinger (2006), Deutsche Orientalistik zur Zeit des Nationalsozialismus 1933–1945 (in German), Berlin: deux mondes, ISBN 3-932662-11-3
- Peter Freimark: Promotion Hedwig Klein – zugleich ein Beitrag zum Seminar für Geschichte und Kultur des Vorderen Orients. In: Eckart Krause u. a. (Hrsg.): Hochschulalltag im „Dritten Reich“. Die Hamburger Universität 1933–1945. Berlin Hamburg 1991, Teil II, pp. 851–864, ISBN 3-496-00882-2. (in German)
- Ludmila Hanisch (2003), Die Nachfolger der Exegeten: Deutschsprachige Erforschung des Vorderen Orients in der ersten Hälfte des 20. Jahrhunderts (in German), Wiesbaden: Harrassowitz, ISBN 978-3-447-04758-6
- Sabine Schmidtke (2026-09-14), Scholar of Islam, Victim of the Holocaust: The Tragic Story of Hedwig Klein, De Gruyter, doi:10.1515/9783111705620, ISBN 978-3-11-914910-5
