= J Milton Cowan =

American linguist (1907–1993)

- Born: February 22, 1907; Salt Lake City, Utah, U.S.
- Died: December 20, 1993 (aged 86)

Academic background
- Education: University of Utah; University of Iowa

Academic work
- Discipline: Linguist
- Institutions: Cornell University

J Milton Cowan (February 22, 1907 – December 20, 1993) was an American linguist.

== Life ==
Born in Salt Lake City, Utah, Cowan was the son of a butcher, who, hesitating between the first names James and John when the boy was born, decided to give him neither but to let the boy make the choice himself when he grew up. However, Cowan never chose one, referring to himself as "J, no period, Milton Cowan".

Cowan paused his college education at the University of Utah to serve as a missionary of the Church of Jesus Christ of Latter-day Saints in Germany (Gleiwitz, Breslau, Magdeburg, Erfurt), acquiring considerable proficiency in the language. Returning to Salt Lake City, he completed a bachelor's degree in German at the University of Utah in 1931 and went on to earn a master's degree in German there in 1932 with a thesis on a Baroque drama by Andreas Gryphius. He then enrolled in Dramatic Art at the University of Iowa, earning a Ph.D. in 1935 with a thesis on the phonetics of stage speech. It was at the University of Iowa that he met his future wife, Theodora Mary Ronayne. In 1936, he was an assistant research associate in Dramatic Art at the University of Iowa, and he also held an assistant professorship in German there from 1938 to 1940 (or 1942; the documentation is spotty). He developed close ties with Bernard Bloch, W. Freeman Twadell, and Martin Joos. In 1942, Cowan moved to Washington, D.C., to work as director of the Intensive Language Program of the American Council of Learned Societies, which under wartime circumstances was closely linked with the Army Specialized Training Program for 29 strategic languages conducted at numerous land-grant universities. These included Cornell University, where Russian and Italian were taught under Army auspices, and in 1946 Cowan was appointed director of Cornell's newly established Division of Modern Languages (DML) to adapt the military's intensive language instruction methods to the regular university curriculum. He also held an appointment as a professor in Cornell's German Department.

Cowan held a number of service positions throughout his life, becoming the president of the Linguistic Society of America in 1966. In 1972, he and his wife co-founded the publishing house Spoken Language Services. His principal publication is the Dictionary of Modern Written Arabic (1961), a revised and expanded English-language version of Hans Wehr's original German Arabisches Wörterbuch für die Schriftsprache der Gegenwart (1952).
