= Hans Wehr =

German Arabist (1909–1981)

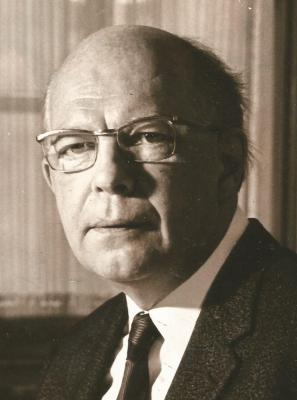
- Wehr in 1972
- Born: Hans Bodo Wehr; 5 July 1909; Leipzig, German Empire
- Died: 24 May 1981 (aged 71); Münster, West Germany

Academic work
- Discipline: Arabist
- Institutions: University of Münster (1957–1974)
- Notable works: Arabisches Wörterbuch für die Schriftsprache der Gegenwart (1952)

Hans Bodo Wehr (German pronunciation: [veːɐ̯]; 5 July 1909 – 24 May 1981) was a German Arabist. He is best known for his work on A Dictionary of Modern Written Arabic, originally published in German as Arabisches Wörterbuch für die Schriftsprache der Gegenwart in 1952. The system of transliteration used in the dictionary has become known as Hans Wehr transliteration.

== Life ==
Wehr was born in Leipzig on 5 July 1909. He attended a gymnasium in Halle, and then studied at universities in Halle, Berlin, and Leipzig. He received his doctorate in 1935 and his habilitation in 1939.

He joined the Nazi Party in 1940, and wrote an essay arguing that Germany should ally with the Arabs against Great Britain and France. He had begun work on an Arabic–German dictionary, and the project received funding from the German government, which intended to use make use of the dictionary in translating Mein Kampf into Arabic. For a time, Wehr was assisted in his project by Hedwig Klein.

His dictionary, entitled Arabisches Wörterbuch für die Schriftsprache der Gegenwart, was eventually published in 1952. An English version, edited by J Milton Cowan and entitled A Dictionary of Modern Written Arabic, was published in 1961. The dictionary used a new system of transliteration, which is today known as Hans Wehr transliteration.

Wehr was a professor at the University of Münster from 1957 until his retirement in 1974. He died in Münster on 24 May 1981.
