= Arabic in the Mashriq =

Arabic varieties of West Asia, Egypt and Sudan

Mashriqi Arabic
- ʿAmmiya, Eastern Arabic
- عامية
- Region: Mashriq
- Ethnicity: Used as a first language by Arabs and as a second language by non-Arab minorities
- Native speakers: 300 million (2018–2022)
- Language family: Afro-Asiatic: Semitic; West; Central; Arabic; Mashriqi Arabic
- Dialects: Baharna; Dhofari; Eastern Egyptian Bedawi; Egyptian; Gulf; Hadhrami; Hijazi; Levantine; Mesopotamian; North Mesopotamian; Najdi; Omani; San'ani; Sa'idi; Shihhi; Sudanese; Ta'izzi-Adeni
- Writing system: Arabic alphabet

Language codes
- ISO 639-3: Variously: abv – Baharna Arabic adf – Dhofari Arabic avl – Eastern Egyptian Bedawi Arabic arz – Egyptian Arabic afb – Gulf Arabic ayh – Hadhrami Arabic acw – Hijazi Arabic apc – Levantine Arabic acm – Mesopotamian Arabic ayp – North Mesopotamian Arabic ars – Najdi Arabic acx – Omani Arabic ayn – Sanʽani Arabic ssh – Shihhi Arabic aec – Saʽidi Arabic apd – Sudanese Arabic acq – Ta'izzi-Adeni Arabic
- Glottolog: None

Mashriqi Arabic, Sharqi Arabic or Mashriqi ʿAmmiya, encompasses the varieties of Arabic spoken in the Mashriq, including the countries of Egypt, Lebanon, Palestine, Kuwait, Jordan, Syria, Turkey, Iraq, Sudan, Saudi Arabia, UAE, Oman, Bahrain and Qatar. The variety is sometimes referred to as Eastern Arabic, as opposed to Western Arabic (Maghrebi Arabic or Darija) and includes Mesopotamian Arabic and Peninsular Arabic, along with Egyptian Arabic, Sudanese Arabic, and Levantine Arabic. Speakers of Mashriqi call their language ʿAmmiya (عامية), which means 'common' or 'colloquial' in Modern Standard Arabic.

Modern Standard Arabic (الفصحى al-fuṣḥā) is the primary official language used in the government, legislation, and judiciary of countries in the Mashriq region. Mashriqi Arabic is used for almost all spoken communication, as well as in television and advertising in Egypt and Lebanon, but Modern Standard Arabic is used in written communication. In Lebanon, where Mashriqi Arabic was taught as a colloquial language as a separate subject under French colonization, some formal textbooks exist.

The varieties of Mashriqi have a high degree of mutual intelligibility, especially between geographically adjacent ones (such as Lebanese and Syrian or between Iraqi and Kuwaiti). On the contrary, Maghrebi dialects, especially those of Algeria and Morocco, are harder to understand for Arabic-speakers from the Mashriqi ones, as it derives from different substrata.

== Varieties ==
- Varieties of Arabic
- Koinés:
  - Egyptian
    - Upper Egyptian (Saʽidi)
  - Gulf
    - Bahrani
  - Hejazi
  - Levantine Arabic
    - Palestinian
    - Jordanian
    - Syrian
    - Lebanese
  - Mesopotamian
    - Gilit
    - Qeltu
  - Najdi
  - Omani
    - Dhofari
  - Sudanese
  - Yemeni
    - Hadhrami
    - Sanʽani
    - Ta’izzi-Adeni
    - Tihamiyya
- Bedouin
  - Bedawi Arabic
