= Qoph =

Nineteenth letter of many Semitic alphabets

← Tsade Qoph Resh →
- Phoenician: 𐤒
- Hebrew: ק
- Samaritan: ࠒ
- Aramaic: 𐡒
- Syriac: ܩ
- Nabataean: 𐢚
- Arabic: ق
- South Arabian: 𐩤
- Geʽez: ቀ
- North Arabian: 𐪄
- Ugaritic: 𐎖
- Phonemic representation: q, g, ʔ, k
- Position in alphabet: 19
- Numerical value: 100

Alphabetic derivatives of the Phoenician
- Greek: Ϙ, Φ
- Latin: Q, Ƣ
- Cyrillic: Ҁ, Ф, Ԛ

Qoph is the nineteenth letter of the Semitic abjads, including Phoenician qōp 𐤒, Hebrew qūp̄ ק, Aramaic qop 𐡒, Syriac qōp̄ ܩ, and Arabic qāf ق. It is also related to the Ancient North Arabian 𐪄, South Arabian 𐩤, and Geʽez ቀ.

Its original sound value was a West Semitic emphatic stop, presumably [kʼ]. In Maltese the q is a glottal stop sound e.g. qalb, qattus, baqq. In Hebrew numerals, it has the numerical value of 100.

== Origins ==
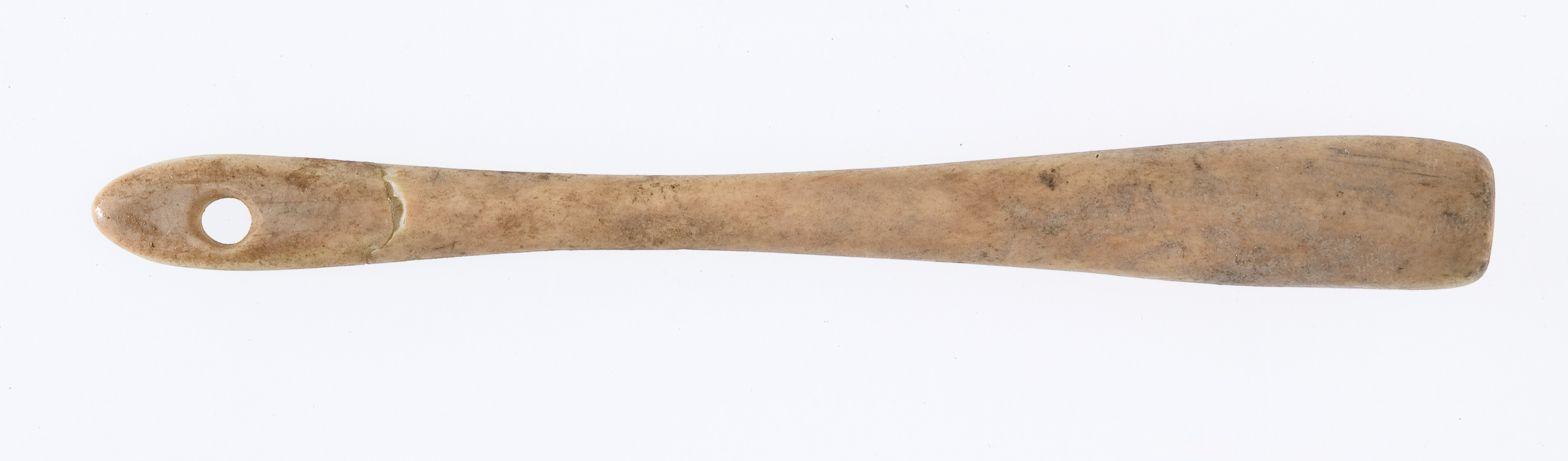
Needle from Ancient Egypt, 13th–10th century BC

The origin of the glyph shape of qōp is uncertain. It is usually suggested to have originally depicted either a sewing needle, specifically the eye of a needle (Hebrew קוף quf and Aramaic קופא qopɑʔ both refer to the eye of a needle), or the back of a head and neck (qāf in Arabic meant "nape"). According to an older suggestion, it may also have been a picture of a monkey and its tail (the Hebrew קוף means "monkey").

Besides Aramaic Qop, which gave rise to the letter in the Semitic abjads used in classical antiquity, Phoenician qōp is also the origin of the Latin letter Q and Greek Ϙ (qoppa) and possibly Φ (phi).

== Arabic qāf ==
The Arabic letter ق is named قاف qāf. It is written in several ways depending on its position in the word:

Qāf قاف
- ق

Usage
- Writing system: Arabic script
- Type: Abjad
- Language of origin: Arabic language
- Sound values: q (standard); g, ʔ, k, ɢ (dialectal)
- Alphabetical position: 21

History
- Development: 𐤒: 𐡒; 𐢚; ٯ; ق

Other
- Writing direction: Right-to-left

Position in word:	Isolated	Final	Medial	Initial
Glyph form: (Help)	ق	ـق	ـقـ	قـ

Traditionally in the scripts of the Maghreb it is written with a single dot, similarly to how the letter fā ف is written in Mashreqi scripts:

Position in word:	Isolated	Final	Medial	Initial
Glyph form: (Help)	ڧ	ـڧ	ـڧـ	ڧـ

It is usually transliterated into Latin script as q, though some scholarly works use ḳ.

=== Pronunciation ===
According to Sibawayh, author of the first book on Arabic grammar, the letter is pronounced voiced (maǧhūr), although some scholars argue, that Sibawayh's term maǧhūr implies lack of aspiration rather than voice. As noted above, Modern Standard Arabic has the voiceless uvular plosive /q/ as its standard pronunciation of the letter, but dialectal pronunciations vary as follows:

The three main pronunciations:

- [q]: in most of Tunisia, Algeria and Morocco, Southern and Western Yemen and parts of Oman, Northern Iraq, parts of the Levant (especially the Alawite and Druze dialects). In fact, it is so characteristic of the Alawites and the Druze that Levantines invented a verb "yqaqi" /jqæqi/ that means "speaking with a /q/". However, most other dialects of Arabic will use this pronunciation in learned words that are borrowed from Standard Arabic into the respective dialect or when Arabs speak Modern Standard Arabic.
- [ɡ]: in most of the Arabian Peninsula, Northern and Eastern Yemen and parts of Oman, Southern Iraq, some parts within Jordan, eastern Syria and southern Palestine, Upper Egypt (Ṣaʿīd), Sudan, Libya, Mauritania and to lesser extent in some parts of Tunisia, Algeria, and Morocco but it is also used partially across those countries in some words.
- [ʔ]: in most of the Levant and Egypt, as well as some North African towns such as Tlemcen and Fez.

Other pronunciations:

- [ɢ]: In Sudanese and some forms of Yemeni, even in loanwords from Modern Standard Arabic or when speaking Modern Standard Arabic.
- [k]: In rural Palestinian it is often pronounced as a voiceless velar plosive [k], even in loanwords from Modern Standard Arabic or when speaking Modern Standard Arabic.

Marginal pronunciations:

- [d͡z]: In some positions in Najdi, though this pronunciation is fading in favor of [ɡ].
- [d͡ʒ]: Optionally in Iraqi and in Gulf Arabic, it is sometimes pronounced as a voiced postalveolar affricate [d͡ʒ], even in loanwords from Modern Standard Arabic or when speaking Modern Standard Arabic.
- [ɣ] ~ [ʁ]: in Sudanese and some Yemeni dialects (Yafi'i), and sometimes in Gulf Arabic by Persian influence, even in loanwords from Modern Standard Arabic or when speaking Modern Standard Arabic.

=== Velar gāf ===
It is not well known when the pronunciation of qāf ⟨ق⟩ as a velar [ɡ] occurred or the probability of it being connected to the pronunciation of jīm ⟨ج⟩ as an affricate [d͡ʒ], but in the Arabian peninsula, there are two sets of pronunciations, either the ⟨ج⟩ represents a [d͡ʒ] and ⟨ق⟩ represents a [ɡ] which is the main pronunciation in most of the peninsula except for western and southern Yemen and parts of Oman where ⟨ج⟩ represents a [ɡ] and ⟨ق⟩ represents a [q].

The Standard Arabic (MSA) combination of ⟨ج⟩ as a [d͡ʒ] and ⟨ق⟩ as a [q] does not occur in any natural modern dialect in the Arabian peninsula, which shows a strong correlation between the palatalization of ⟨ج⟩ to [d͡ʒ] and the pronunciation of the ⟨ق⟩ as a [ɡ] as shown in the table below:

Language varieties	Pronunciation of the letters	
Language varieties	ج	ق
Proto-Semitic	[ɡ]	[kʼ]
Dialects in parts of Oman and Yemen^{1}	[ɡ]	[q]
Modern Standard Arabic^{2}	[d͡ʒ]	[q]
Dialects in most of the Arabian Peninsula	[d͡ʒ]	[ɡ]

Notes:

1. Western and southern Yemen: Taʽizzi, Adeni and Tihamiyya dialects (coastal Yemen), in addition to southwestern (Salalah region) and eastern Oman, including Muscat, the capital.
2. As used in the Arabian Peninsula: in Sanaa; ق is [ɡ] in Sanʽani dialect and also in the literary standard (local MSA), whereas the literary standard pronunciation in Sudan is [ɢ] or [ɡ]. For the pronunciation of ج in Modern Standard Arabic, check Jīm.

=== Pronunciation across other languages ===
Language	Dialect(s) / Script(s)	Pronunciation (IPA)
Azeri	Arabic alphabet	/g/
Kurdish	Sorani	/q/
Malay	Jawi	/q/ or /k/
Pashto		/q/ or /k/
Persian	Dari	/q/
Persian	Iranian	/ɢ/~/ɣ/ or /q/
Punjabi	Shahmukhi	/q/ or /k/
Urdu		/q/ or /k/
Uyghur		/q/

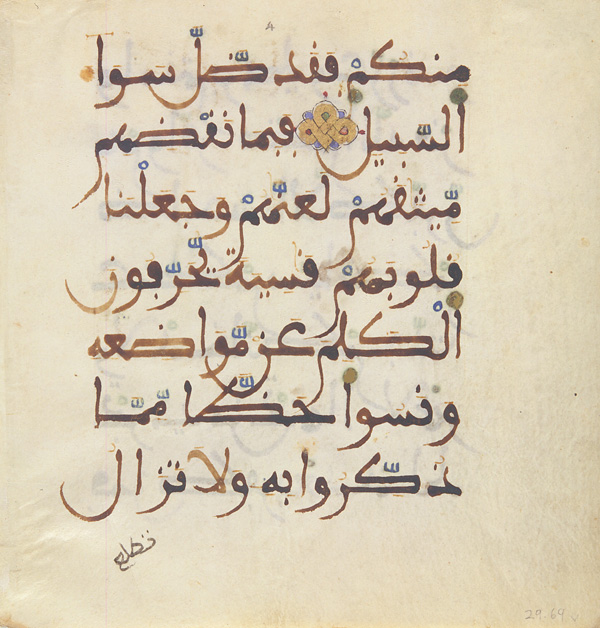
In this 13th century Quran folio from North Africa, the qāf and fāʼ are rendered according to traditional Maghrebi style. The text reads:مِنكُمْ فَقَد ضَّلَّ سَوَاء السَّبِيِل فَبِمَا نَقْضِهِم مِّيثـٰقَهُمْ لَعَنَّـٰهُمْ وِجَعَلْنَا قُلُوبَهُمْ قَـٰسِيةً يُحَرِّفُونَ الْكَلِمَ عَنْ مَّوَاضِعِهِ وَنَسُوا حَظٍّا مِّمَّا ذُكِّرُوا بِهِ وَلاَتَزَالُ

=== Maghrebi variant ===
The Maghrebi style of writing qāf is different: having only a single point (dot) above; when the letter is isolated or word-final, it may sometimes become unpointed.

The Maghrebi qāf
Position in word:	Isolated	Final	Medial	Initial
Form of letter:	ڧ ࢼ	ـڧ ـࢼ	ـڧـ	ڧـ

The earliest Arabic manuscripts show qāf in several variants: pointed (above or below) or unpointed. Then the prevalent convention was having a point above for qāf and a point below for fāʼ; this practice is now only preserved in manuscripts from the Maghribi, with the exception of Libya and Algeria, where the Mashriqi form (two dots above: ق) prevails.

Within Maghribi texts, there is no possibility of confusing it with the letter fāʼ, as it is instead written with a dot underneath (ڢ) in the Maghribi script.

== Hebrew qof ==
The Oxford Hebrew-English Dictionary transliterates the letter Qoph (קוֹף) as q or k; and, when word-final, it may be transliterated as ck. The English spellings of Biblical names (as derived via Latin from Biblical Greek) containing this letter may represent it as c or k, e.g. Cain for Hebrew Qayin, or Kenan for Qenan (Genesis 4:1, 5:9).

Orthographic variants
Various print fonts			Cursive Hebrew	Solitreo	Rashi script
Serif	Sans-serif	Monospaced	Cursive Hebrew	Solitreo	Rashi script
ק	ק	ק			

=== Pronunciation ===
In modern Israeli Hebrew the letter is also called kuf. The letter represents /k/; i.e., no distinction is made between the pronunciations of Qof and Kaph with Dagesh (in modern Hebrew).

However, many historical groups have made that distinction, with Qof being pronounced [q] by Iraqi Jews and other Mizrahim, or even as [ɡ] by Yemenite Jews influenced by Yemeni Arabic.

Qoph is consistently transliterated into classical Greek with the unaspirated〈κ〉/k/, while Kaph (both its allophones) is transliterated with the aspirated〈χ〉/kʰ/. Thus Qoph was unaspirated /k/ where Kaph was /kʰ/, this distinction is no longer present. Further we know that Qoph is one of the emphatic consonants through comparison with other Semitic languages, and most likely was ejective /kʼ/. In Arabic the emphatics are pharyngealised and this causes a preference for back vowels, this is not shown in Hebrew orthography. Though the gutturals show a preference for certain vowels, Hebrew emphatics do not in Tiberian Hebrew (the Hebrew dialect recorded with vowels) and therefore were most likely not pharyngealised, but ejective, pharyngealisation being a result of Arabisation.

=== Numeral ===
Qof in Hebrew numerals represents the number 100. Sarah is described in Genesis Rabba as בת ק' כבת כ' שנה לחטא, literally "At Qof years of age, she was like Kaph years of age in sin", meaning that when she was 100 years old, she was as sinless as when she was 20.

== Syriac qop ==
Position in word:	Isolated	Final	Medial	Initial
Glyph form: (Help)	ܩ	ـܩ	ـܩـ	ܩـ

== Unicode ==
Character information
Preview	ק		ق		ڧ		ࢼ		ܩ		ࠒ	
Unicode name	HEBREW LETTER QOF		ARABIC LETTER QAF		ARABIC LETTER QAF WITH DOT ABOVE		ARABIC LETTER AFRICAN QAF		SYRIAC LETTER QAPH		SAMARITAN LETTER QUF	
Encodings	decimal	hex	dec	hex	dec	hex	dec	hex	dec	hex	dec	hex
Unicode	1511	U+05E7	1602	U+0642	1703	U+06A7	2236	U+08BC	1833	U+0729	2066	U+0812
UTF-8	215 167	D7 A7	217 130	D9 82	218 167	DA A7	224 162 188	E0 A2 BC	220 169	DC A9	224 160 146	E0 A0 92
Numeric character reference	&#1511;	&#x5E7;	&#1602;	&#x642;	&#1703;	&#x6A7;	&#2236;	&#x8BC;	&#1833;	&#x729;	&#2066;	&#x812;

Character information
Preview	𐎖		𐡒		𐤒	
Unicode name	UGARITIC LETTER QOPA		IMPERIAL ARAMAIC LETTER QOPH		PHOENICIAN LETTER QOF	
Encodings	decimal	hex	dec	hex	dec	hex
Unicode	66454	U+10396	67666	U+10852	67858	U+10912
UTF-8	240 144 142 150	F0 90 8E 96	240 144 161 146	F0 90 A1 92	240 144 164 146	F0 90 A4 92
UTF-16	55296 57238	D800 DF96	55298 56402	D802 DC52	55298 56594	D802 DD12
Numeric character reference	&#66454;	&#x10396;	&#67666;	&#x10852;	&#67858;	&#x10912;
