= Tihami Arabic =

Variety of Arabic

Tihamiyya Arabic
- Tihamiyya, Tihami
- تهامية
- Native to: Yemen
- Region: Tihamah
- Language family: Afro-Asiatic: Semitic; West Semitic; Central Semitic; Arabic; Peninsular; Yemeni; Ta'izzi-Adeni; Tihamiyya Arabic
- Writing system: Arabic alphabet

Language codes
- ISO 639-3: –

Tihāmiyyah (Arabic: تهامية Tihāmiyyah; also known as Tihamiyya, Tihami) is the dialect of the Arabic language originally spoken only by the people of the historic region of the Tihamah which is the coastal plain at the western shore of Yemen. Even though the term Tihama in a broader sense refers to all of the Eastern coastal plain of the Red Sea from the Gulf of Aqaba to the Bab el Mandeb, it is often used especially for the more Southern part of the plain.

== Pronunciation ==
The Tihami Arabic or Tihamiyya dialect has many aspects which differentiate it from all other dialects in the Arab world. Phonologically Tihami is similar to the majority of Yemeni dialects, pronouncing the qāf (ق) as [q] and the ǧīm (ج) as a velar plosive [ɡ] (the ǧīm pronunciation is also shared with Egyptian Arabic) unlike San'ani and Hadhrami Arabic which pronounce the qāf (ق) as [g]. Grammatically all Tihami dialects also share the unusual feature of utilizing the definite article (am-) as opposed to the prefix (al-) seen in many Arabic varieties. The future tense, much like the dialects surrounding Sanaa, is indicated with the prefix (š-), for all persons, e.g. ša-būk am-sūq "I will go to the Souq". Some Tihami dialects, such as that spoken in Al-Hodeida, are otherwise fairly similar to other Yemeni dialects in grammar and syntax, differing mainly in vocabulary, while others can be so far from any other Arabic dialect that they are practically incomprehensible even to other Yemenis.

== See also ==
- Varieties of Arabic
- Yemeni Arabic
- Zabid
