= Indonesian Arabic =

Arabic language variety

- Local Arabic
- Bahasa Arab Indonesia العربية الاندونيسية
- Trilingual Arabic–English–Indonesian signage in an Indonesian elementary school
- Native to: Indonesia
- Region: Area with a significant population of Arabs descent and pesantren
- Ethnicity: Arab Indonesians; Santri (formal)
- Native speakers: 60,000 (2010)
- Language family: Afro-Asiatic: Semitic; West Semitic; Central Semitic; Arabic; Peninsular; Yemeni; Hadhrami Arabic; Indonesian Arabic
- Dialects: Gontor Arabic; Martapura Arabic; Other varieties (see #Geographical varieties)
- Writing system: Arabic script

Language codes
- ISO 639-3: –
- Glottolog: None
- IETF: ayh-ID
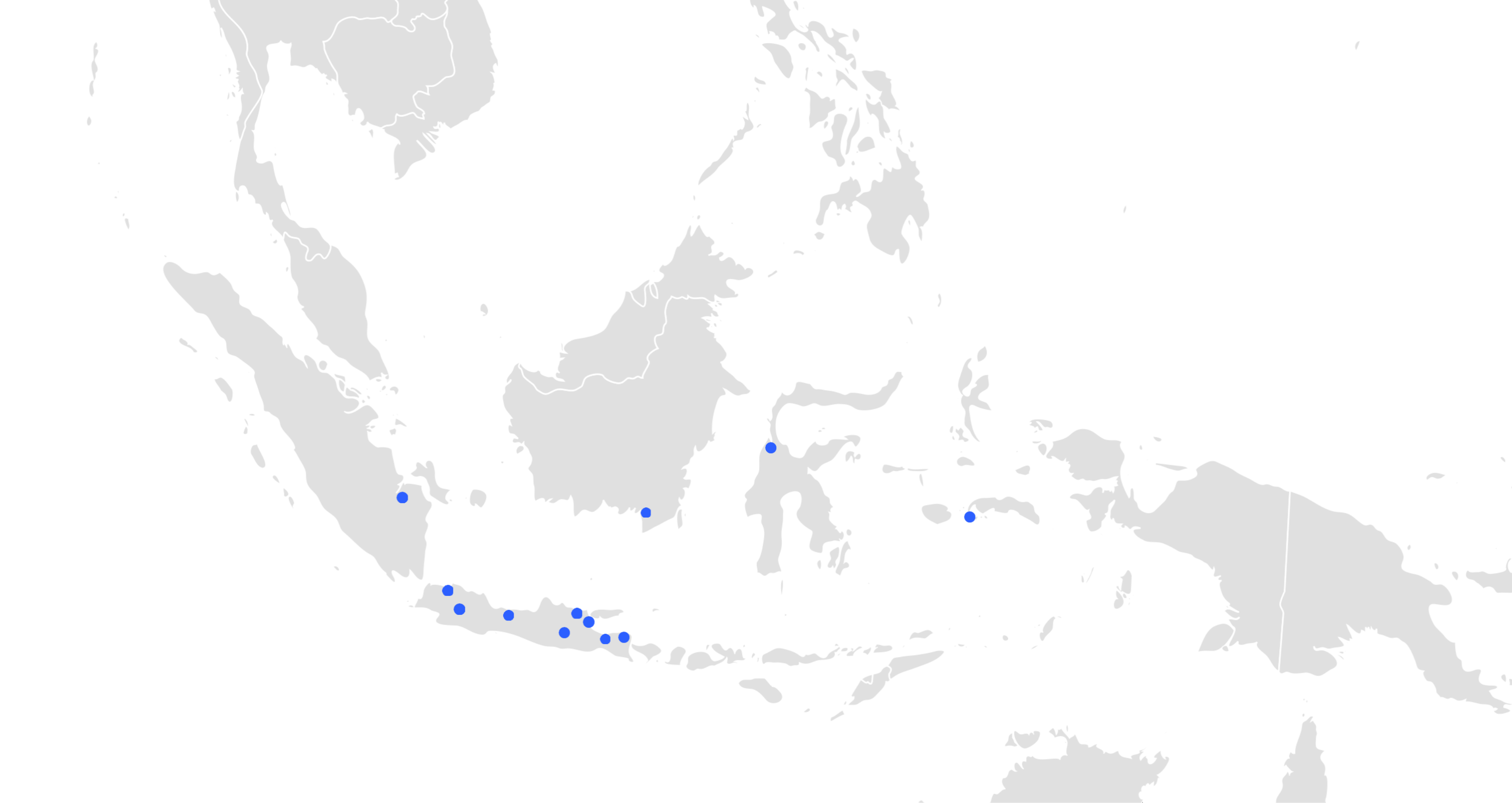
- The location of Indonesian Arabic usage in the enclave is marked with a blue circle; it is primarily found in the eastern part of Java

Indonesian Arabic (Arabic: العربية الاندونيسية, romanized: al-‘Arabiyya al-Indūnīsiyya, Indonesian: Bahasa Arab Indonesia) is a variety of Arabic spoken in Indonesia. It is primarily spoken by people of Arab descents and by students (santri) who study Arabic at Islamic educational institutions or pesantren. This language generally incorporates loanwords from regional Indonesian languages in its usage, reflecting the areas where it is spoken.

== History ==
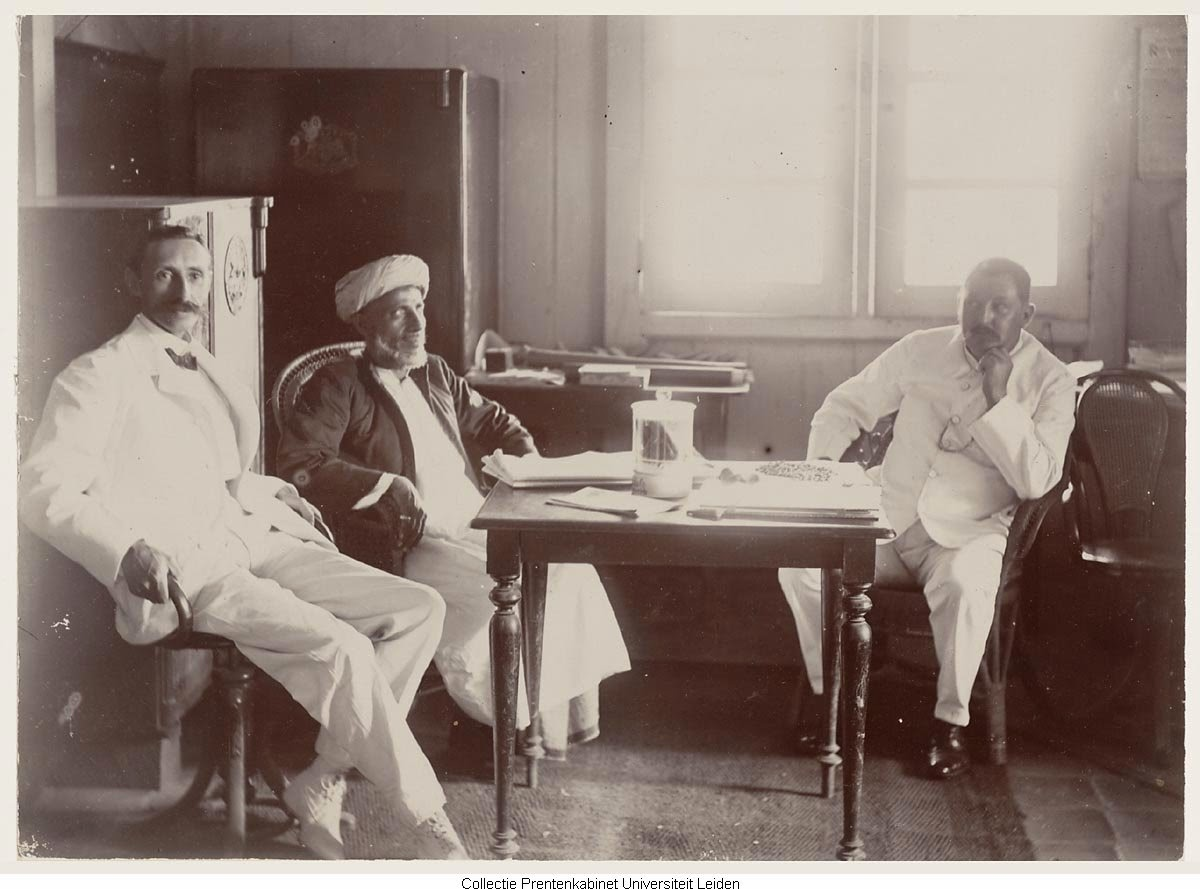
Arabic speakers in Talise, Palu c. 1920

From a historical perspective, Arabic language and culture have been known since the introduction of Islam to the Malay Archipelago, or better known in Classical Arabic as الجزائر الجاوي, al-Jazaʿir al-Jawi, lit. 'Java Archipelago', which means that long before Indonesia's independence, Arabic was already becoming familiar to the indigenous peoples. When examining the relationship between Arabic and Islam in Indonesia, it is clear that Arabic culture and language have had a significant influence on the life of the society and the culture of Islam in Indonesia. For example, in terms of the language used daily by the people, Arabic is one of the foreign elements that has contributed a substantial amount of vocabulary to the native languages in Indonesia, including standard Indonesian, the official language of Indonesia. The development of the Arabic occurred due to the arrival of Arab and Persian traders in Indonesia over a long period. It is known that Arabic language and literature are estimated to have been present in Indonesia since the early 7th to 8th centuries AD and began to develop rapidly during the 9th to 12th centuries AD. This theory is supported and agreed upon by Hamka, van Leur, and T.W. Arnold.

== Distribution and usage ==
The Arabic spoken in Indonesia is generally used by people of Arab descent and Islamic students (santri), primarily based on Hadhrami Arabic brought by Arab traders from Hadramaut, Yemen. This language has a unique feature, which is the mixture of vocabulary from Arabic and Indonesian, as well as other regional languages. This is notably different from the Modern Standard Arabic used by 21st-century Arab expatriates. The language is commonly used in Islamic educational institutions or pesantren and in villages inhabited by people of Arab descent, often referred to as Kampung Arab 'Arab village'.

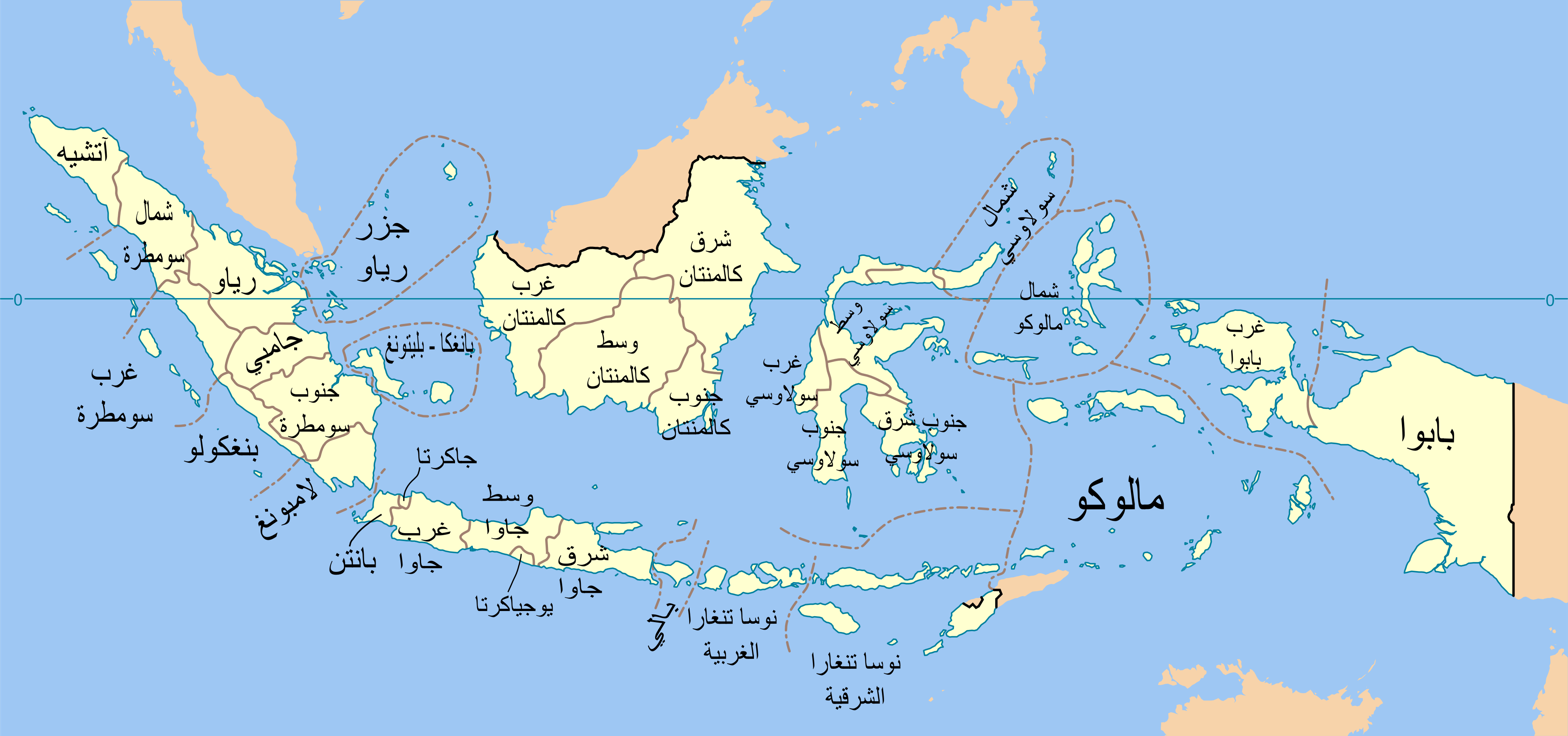
Map of provinces of Indonesia in the 21st century with names in Arabic.

Arabic in Indonesia is generally spoken by Arab descendants in Bogor (Empang and Cisarua), Surabaya (Ampel), Bangkalan (Kamal), Jakarta (Pekojan), Gresik (Gapura), Pekalongan (Sugihwaras), Kediri, Pasuruan (Bangil), Bondowoso, Banjarmasin, Surakarta (Pasar Kliwon), Palembang, Palu (Talise), Ambon, Martapura, Yogyakarta (Sayidan), and other areas with a significant Arab-descendant population in Indonesia. Arab descendants and their language are also found in Fakfak, a small town on the west coast of Papua, the easternmost island of Indonesia. Their presence there can be traced back to the 1800s, where their Arabic surnames became their trademark.

Currently, the number of speakers is approximately half of the Arab descendants, or perhaps even less. This number does not include the santri who use it as a formal language. Based on rough estimates, this language had about 60,000 speakers in 2010. Rather than maintaining their Arabic language, younger generations typically prefer to use Malay-based creole languages, where they actually play a significant role in contributing Arabic vocabulary, but it is then adapted to local pronunciation. A prominent example is Betawi, where the majority of Arab descendants in urban Jakarta currently use this language. Indonesian Arabic also has a big influence on the Condet dialect, a dialect of Betawi language, where Arabic vocabulary is mostly found, more pronounced than other Betawi dialects. Also with some Malay influence. Arabic-Malay script (Jawi) was also quite often used by the indigenous people of Condet in East Jakarta, especially during the Dutch colonial era.

Because of its influence on the native languages in the areas where it is used and its considerable influence on the official language, Indonesian, also because of the fluent assimilation of its speakers since long ago. Indonesian Arabic began to mix with native languages in Indonesia to form Para-Arabic or Pseudo-Arabic varieties, because the grammar mostly deviates from Arabic rules and looks very small, but its influence can be seen especially in terms of the vocabulary used, especially also mixed with the native languages that are more dominant in the region. This code mixing then formed a mixed language used by groups of Arab descendants who assimilated with the indigenous peoples. For example, in the Klego subdistrict in Pekalongan, the Arab people there speak Arabic with influences from Javanese grammar and a broader vocabulary.

There are two varieties of Arabic that are usually used in Indonesia, namely Amiyah or colloquial Arabic, especially by Arab descendants in Indonesia in daily communication among their communities. Also Fusha, which is standard Arabic which is usually used by students in formal activities at Islamic boarding schools, or also by Arab descendants, for example in their worship or formal activities. From the results of the acculturation between Arabic of Fusha and Amiyah, as well as their everyday language, at the Darussalam Gontor Modern Islamic Boarding School, have created their own Gontor Arabic dialect which is used by the students there. Apart from that, there is also the Martapura Arabic dialect which is used by Arab descendants in Martapura, South Kalimantan. It is heavily influenced by the Banjar language in its language, especially its loanwords and pronunciation, and is also influenced by Indonesian.

== Linguistic errors ==
It has been revealed that the use of Arabic is significantly influenced by syntax in Indonesian, particularly among santri in pesantren. Phrases such as lâ mâdza-mâdza (لا ماذا ماذا, meaning 'it's okay') or maujûd-maujûd faqath (موجود موجود فقط, meaning 'seriously') are examples of syntactic errors in Arabic among santri that result in word reduplication. In reality, when looked at word by word in Indonesian, these examples are not incorrect, but when combined, they become less accurate and hard to understand, and they cannot be found in other varieties of Arabic, as these expressions do not exist in their language. The correct expression in Modern Standard Arabic for 'it's okay' is lâ ba’sa (لا بأس) or laisa musykilah (ليس مشكلة). Meanwhile, the expression 'just there' essentially responds to something considered a joke or something unusual, and it can be translated into Modern Standard Arabic as laqad mazahta (لقد مزحت, meaning 'you are just joking') or hâdzaâ sya’un jadîd (هذا شيء جديد, meaning 'this is something new').

The inaccuracy in using expressions like these in this variation of Arabic is certainly influenced by Indonesian, or more precisely, by colloquial Indonesian. Another possible cause could be a lack of understanding of Arabic rules and knowledge about them, or it could be because such expressions have become common in forming Arabic sentences among santri. Native speakers of other Arabic varieties might consider or view this as Arabic with poor pronunciation and grammar. This also includes, for example, changes in pronunciation and sound in Arabic vocabulary that are adapted to local pronunciation in Indonesia, as in the case of Colloquial Arabic-Javanese.

== Linguistic status ==
Arabic is recognized as a foreign and minority language in Indonesia, without the status of an official or regional language. But it remains an important language in Indonesia, especially by Indonesian Muslims there, where Arabic is considered as one of their religious language used in prayers and recitation of the Quran. The position of Arabic is also considered important for the Indonesian government, especially in relation to diplomacy with foreign countries, especially Arabic-speaking countries. Arabic also played an important role in diplomacy between Indonesia and Egypt, especially in the early period of Indonesian independence and Egypt's support for it. Mastery of Arabic, especially by accomplished diplomats such as Agus Salim, was key to building close diplomatic relations and gaining international support.

== Geographical varieties ==
Ferguson (1970) in The Role of Arabic in Ethiopia: a Sociolinguistic Perspective explains that the area where Arabic is used includes Morocco in the west to the Persian Gulf, across the Red Sea to Ethiopia and Somalia in the Horn of Africa, then to the Gujarat in India and a small part of Xinjiang in China, up to the Southeast Asian region including Indonesia. In Indonesia, based on its geographical varieties, Arabic is grouped into:

- North Coast of Java – including Tuban, Gresik, Semarang, Pekalongan, Tegal, Cirebon, which is influenced by Javanese, then Tanjung Priok (also includes Pekojan and Condet) which is influenced by Betawi, and Ampel which is influenced by Javanese and Madurese.
- East Coast of Java (Tapal Kuda) – Bangil and Situbondo, which are heavily influenced by Javanese and Madurese.
- Interior of East Java – Malang and Jember are heavily influenced by Javanese, and also, to a certain extent, by Madurese influence, especially in Jember.
- Interior of Central Java – Bumiayu, Surakarta, and Yogyakarta, which are influenced by Javanese. However, in Surakarta and Yogyakarta, it is very influenced by standard Javanese, unlike in Bumiayu, which is influenced by the Banyumasan dialect.

Other varieties also cover areas outside Java, such as in Sumatra, the Palembang variety, which is influenced by Palembang. Also the Banjar-speaking regional variety in Kalimantan, especially in Banjarmasin and Martapura. Apart from that, other geographical variations were also found, such as Bangkalan to Sumenep with Madurese influences, as well as the Kangean variety with Kangean, Bugis, and Madurese influences. Also the Empang and Cisarua varieties in Bogor which are influenced by Sundanese.

== See also ==
- Varieties of Arabic
- Arab Indonesians
- Hadhrami Arabic
