= Ahmad Al-Khowaiter =

Saudi chemical engineer

Ahmad Al-Khowaiter (Arabic: احمد الخويطر) is a Saudi chemical engineer and the current CTO of Saudi Aramco.

== Education ==
Al-Khowaiter earned a B.S. degree in chemical engineering from the King Fahd University of Petroleum & Minerals (KFUPM), an M.S. degree in chemical engineering from the University of California at Santa Barbara, and an MBA degree from the Sloan business school at the Massachusetts Institute of Technology.

== See also ==
- Economy of Saudi Arabia
