= Eastern Arabic =

Eastern Arabic may refer to:

- Arabic in the Mashriq, one of the two main varieties of Arabic (as opposed to Western Arabic, also called Maghrebi Arabic or Darija), spoken in the Mashriq, the eastern part of the Arab world,
- Levantine Arabic, a variety of Arabic spoken in the Levant region of the Arab world, and a sub-variety of Mashriqi Arabic.
