= Gulf Arabic =

Arabic language spoken in the Persian Gulf

- Khaleeji
- خليجي, Ḫalīji اللهجة الخليجية, el-lahja el-Khalījiyya
- Pronunciation: [χɑˈliːdʒi]
- Native to: Kuwait, Oman, Qatar, UAE, Iraq, Saudi Arabia
- Speakers: 11 million (2018–2021)
- Language family: Afro-Asiatic: Semitic; West Semitic; Central Semitic; Arabic; Peninsular; Gulf Arabic
- Dialects: Bahraini; Emirati; Kuwaiti; Omani; Qatari
- Writing system: Arabic alphabet

Language codes
- ISO 639-3: afb
- Glottolog: gulf1241
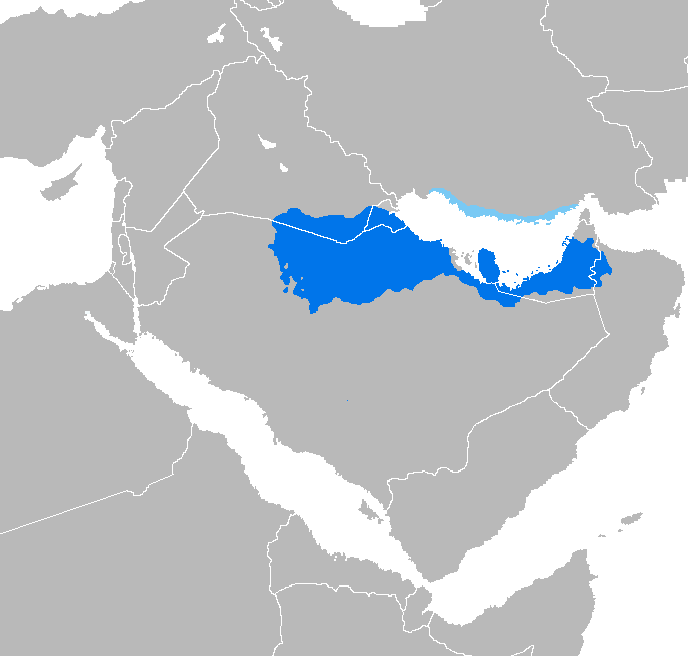
- Areas where Gulf Arabic is spoken (areas where it is the majority language in dark blue)

Gulf Arabic or Khaleeji (خليجي Ḫalīji, local pronunciation: [χɑˈliːd͡ʒi] or اللهجة الخليجية el-lahja el-Ḫalījiyya, [(ə)lˈlɑhd͡ʒɐ lχɑliːˈd͡ʒɪj.jɐ]) is a variety of Arabic spoken in Eastern Arabia around the coasts of the Persian Gulf in Kuwait, Bahrain, Qatar, the United Arab Emirates, southern Iraq, eastern Saudi Arabia, northern Oman, and by some Iranian Arabs.

Gulf Arabic can be defined as a set of closely related and more-or-less mutually intelligible varieties that form a dialect continuum, with the level of mutual intelligibility between any two varieties largely depending on the distance between them. Similar to other varieties, Gulf Arabic is not completely mutually intelligible with varieties spoken outside the Gulf. The specific dialects differ in vocabulary, grammar and accent. There are considerable differences between, for instance, Kuwaiti Arabic and the dialects of Qatar and the UAE, especially in pronunciation, that may hinder mutual intelligibility. The Gulf has two major dialect types that differ phonologically and morphologically, typically referred to as badawī 'Bedouin' and ḥadarī 'sedentary', which in simpler terms mean "desert dweller" and "city dweller". The differences mark important cultural differences between those who historically practiced pastoralism and those who were sedentary.

Gulf varieties' closest related relatives are other dialects native to the Arabian Peninsula, i.e. Najdi Arabic, Mesopotamian Arabic and Bahrani Arabic. Although spoken over much of Saudi Arabia's area, Gulf Arabic is not the native tongue of most Saudis, as the majority of them do not live in Eastern Arabia. There are some 200,000 Gulf Arabic speakers in the country, out of a population of over 30 million, mostly in the aforementioned Eastern Province.

== Name ==
Peninsular Arabic varieties (Gulf Arabic indicated by dark maroon)

The dialect's full name el-lahja el-Khalijiyya (اللهجة الخليجية [əlˈlɑhd͡ʒɐ lχɑˈliːd͡ʒɪj.jɐ]) can be translated as 'the dialect of the gulf'. However, it is most commonly referred to as Khalīji (خليجي [χɑˈliːd͡ʒi]), in which the noun Khalīj (خليج [χɑˈliːd͡ʒ]) has been suffixed with the Nisba, literally meaning 'of the bay' or 'of the gulf'.

== Phonology ==
=== Consonants ===
Gulf Arabic consonant phonemes
		Labial	Dental	Denti-alveolar/Alveolar		Palatal	Dorsal		Pharyn- geal	Glottal
		Labial	Dental	plain	emphatic	Palatal	Velar	Uvular	Pharyn- geal	Glottal
Nasal		m		n						
Plosive	voiceless	(p)		t	tˤ	tʃ	k	q		ʔ
Plosive	voiced	b		d		dʒ	ɡ			
Fricative	voiceless	f	θ	s	sˤ	ʃ	x		ħ	h
Fricative	voiced		ð	z	ðˤ		ɣ		ʕ	
Trill				r						
Approximant				l		j	w			

Phonetic notes:

- /p/ only occurs in loanwords; the non-native letter ⟨پ⟩, or its native counterpart /b/ ⟨ب⟩, are used to denote this sound e.g.: piyāḷah (پيالة or بيالة [pijɒːlˤɒh], 'small glass'), from Persian.
- A feature that distinguishes Gulf Arabic dialects from other Arabic varieties is the retention of the dental fricatives /θ/ and /ð/, which in many other dialects merged with other sounds; similarly, the reflex of the merger of classical */ɮˤ/ ⟨ض⟩ and */ðˤ/ ⟨ظ⟩ is often /dˤ/ in some dialects but is a fricative (either /ðˤ/ or /zˤ/) in Gulf dialects. It shares this feature with most Peninsular and Mesopotamian dialects.
- /ɮˤ/ ⟨ض⟩ has merged to /ðˤ/ ⟨ظ⟩.
- Historically, /q/ became [ɡ] in Gulf Arabic. Due to influence from MSA, the sound was reintroduced in a handful of classicisms. A number of speakers realize this restricted phoneme as a voiced uvular stop; these same speakers have post-velar or uvular realizations of /x/ and /ɣ/ ([χ] and [ʁ], respectively). For such speakers, [ɢ] and the [ʁ] are in free variation while other speakers distinguish /q/ from /ɣ/. Thus قرآن /qurʔaːn/ may be realized as [ɢɪrʔaːn] or [ʁɪrʔaːn] for such speakers.
- The emphatic consonants /tˤ dˤ sˤ ðˤ/ are variably described in the literature as having secondary velarization or pharyngealization. Other emphatic consonants can be found, but these are the result of a process that spreads the velarization/pharyngealization of these sounds on surrounding consonants. E.g. بطولة /butˤuːla/ ('championship') [bˤʊtˤʊːla]('championship').

=== Allophony ===
/k/ and /ɡ/ are often palatalized when occurring before front vowels unless the following consonant is emphatic. The actual realization is in free variation, and can be [kʲ ɡʲ] or, more commonly, [tʃ dʒ]. Speakers who exhibit variation between [ɡʲ] and [dʒ] do so in words derived from historical /q/ (e.g. مقابل [mɪgʲæːbɪl~mɪdʒæːbɪl] 'opposite'); [j] is a contemporary reflex of historical /dʒ/ and so there are also sets of words where [dʒ] and [j] appear in free variation (e.g. (e.g. جار [dʒæːr~jæːr] 'neighbor').

Voiced stops tend to devoice in utterance-final position, especially as the final element in clusters, e.g. كلب ('dog') /kalb/ [tʃælp].

A notable aspect of Gulf Arabic is the different realization of a number of phonemes inherited from Classical Arabic. These differences are the result, in part, of natural linguistic changes over time. After these changes occurred, the original sounds (or close approximations to them) were reintroduced as a result of contact with other dialects, as well as through influence of Modern Standard Arabic as a language of media, government, and religion. For many of these sounds, speakers exhibit free variation between the MSA form and the colloquial form. The following table provides a rough outline of these differences:

Letter	MSA pronunciation	Khaliji varieties	Examples	Notes
ج	/d͡ʒ/	[j] or [d͡ʒ]	mōy or mōj (موج [moːj] or [moːd͡ʒ], 'wave'); masyid or masjid (مسجد [ˈmɒsjɪd] or [ˈmɒsd͡ʒɪd], 'mosque')	Changes are optional, although jim (ج) never changes to [j] in recent loanwords from MSA.
ق	/q/	/q/ (in Classical Arabic words); [ɡ] and, when followed by a front vowel (/a/, /aː/ /eː/, /i/ or /iː/) [d͡ʒ]	jiddām (قدام [d͡ʒɪdˈdɑːm] , 'in front of'); sharji (شرقي [ˈʃɑɾd͡ʒi] 'eastern')	Many Literary Arabic loanwords preserve the /q/ sound, but optionally use /ɡ/. By Persian influence, extremely rarely the qaf (ق) changes to ghayn (غ) /ɣ/.
غ	/ɣ/	[ɣ], [q]	qannā (غنى [ˈqɑnnæ], 'to sing')	Ghayn occasionally changes to [q] or /ɡ/ by Persian influence.
ك	/k/	/k/, [t͡ʃ] if preceded or followed by a front vowel or if 2nd person feminine singular suffixed/object pronoun	ubūch (أبوك [ʔʊˈbʊːt͡ʃ]; 'your [f.sg.] father')	This change is optional, but encountered with more often when the kaf (ك) is used to denote the 2nd person feminine singular suffixed/object pronoun.
ض	/dˤ/	[ðˤ]	ẓāʼ (ضاع [ðˤɒːʕ], 'to lose')	Ẓāʼ (ظ) and Ḍad (ض) are not distinguished by pronunciation, as the Gulf dialects lack the emphatic [d]. However, they retain their orthographic distinction.

=== Vowels ===
Gulf Arabic has five long vowels and three or four short monophthongs. Two recent studies point to a lack of phonemic contrast between [i] and [u], and Shockley (2020) argues that backness is not phonemically contrastive in short vowels. The most recent grammar of Gulf Arabic similarly points to a reduced central vowel [ə] as a frequent reflex of all short vowels.

Gulf Arabic Vowel Phonemes
	Front		Back	
	short	long	short	long
Close	i	iː	u	uː
Mid		eː	(o)	oː
Open	a	aː		

=== Allophony ===
Regional variations in vowel pronunciation is considerable, particularly outside of educated speech. Unless otherwise noted, the following are major allophonic variants shared across the entire Gulf region.

==== Front vowels ====
In the context of emphatic consonants, long /iː/ and /eː/ exhibit centralized vowel onglides and offglides. For example:

- /tˤiːn/ طين ('mud') → [tˤ^{ə}iːn].
- /sˤeːf/ صيف ('summer') → [sˤ^{ə}eːf] .
- /tiħiːdˤ/ ('she menstruates') → [tɪħiː^{ə}dˤ].

Similarly, the normal realization of short /i/ is [ɪ] except in final position, where it is [i]; when adjacent to emphatic, uvular, or bilabial consonants, /i/ is centralized to [ɨ].

- /binti/ ('my daughter') → [bɪnti].
- /kiˈtaːb/ كتاب ('book') → [kəˈtaːb].
- /ruːħi/ ('go! [f]') → [rʊːħi].

When between two emphatic, uvular, or bilabial consonants, /i/ is fully backed to [ʊ].

- /tˤibb/ طِبّ ('medicine') → [tˤʊbˤbˤ].
- /ɡallib/ قَلِّب ('turn over!') → [gɑlˤlˤʊbˤ].

The normal realization of short /a/ is a front [æ]; when adjacent to dorsal and pharyngeal consonants, the normal realization is a back [ɑ]; when adjacent to emphatic consonants (and, for some speakers, bilabial consonants), the realization is a back and rounded [ɒ]:

- /badu/ بَدْو ('Bedouin') → [bædu].
- /baʕad/ بعد ('after') → [bɑʕɑd].
- /ɡahwa/ قهوة ('coffee') → [ɡɑhwɑ].
- /sˤaff/ صف ('row') → [sˤɒfˤfˤ].

When both a dorsal/pharyngeal consonant and emphatic consonant are adjacent to a vowel, the realization is [ɒ].

For /aː/, the pattern is largely the same except that, when adjacent to dorsal/pharyngeal consonants, the realization is [aː].

- /sˤaːm/ ('he fasted') → [sˤɒːmˤ].
- /ɡaːl/ ('he said') → [ɡaːl].
- /ʕaːfja/ عافية ('health') → [ʕaːfja].

Word-finally, long /aː/ is shortened and subjected to the same phonological rules as short /a/. This shortening can lead to alternations based on morphological conditioning, e.g. [ɣadæ] ('lunch') vs. [ɣadæːk] ('your lunch').

==== Back vowels ====
/uː/ is normally realized as [ʊː]. Similarly, /u/ is realized [ʊ] except when unstressed, in which case it is reduced to [ə] if it is not deleted altogether (e.g. /bujuːt/ → [bəjʊːt] or [bjʊːt] 'houses').

The short vowel phoneme /o/ occurs rarely as a variant of the diphthong /aw/ in a handful of words (e.g. لو /lo/ 'if').

== Morphology ==
Similarly to other Arabic varieties, Gulf Arabic has lost much of the case inflection of Classical Arabic. Possession is marked with the particles /maːl-/ and /ħaɡɡ-/, which are attached to possessive enclitics.

=== Pronouns ===
Gulf Arabic has 10 personal pronouns. The conservative dialect has preserved the gender differentiation of the 2nd and 3rd person in the plural forms, whereas dual forms have not survived. The following table bears the generally most common pronouns:

Person		Singular	Plural
1st		ānā (آنَا)	niḥin (نِحِنْ)
2nd	masculine	inta (إِنْتَ)	intum (إِنْتُمْ)
2nd	feminine	inti (إِنْتِ)	intin^{1} (إِنْتِنْ)
3rd	masculine	huwa (هُوَ)	hum (هُمْ)
3rd	feminine	hiya (هِيَ)	hin^{2} (هِنْ)

- ^1 Many speakers do not distinguish between masculine and feminine forms in the second person plural, replacing intum and intin with intu (إنْتُ).
- ^2 Speakers that do not distinguish between masculine and feminine forms in the third person plural will also use hum (هُمْ) for both genders in the third person plural, respectively.

Some pronouns, however, have other (less frequent, resp. local) forms:

- ānā (آنَا):
  anā (أَنَا)
  āni (آنِي) (especially Baḥrānī)
- inta (إِنْتَ):
  init (إِنِتْ)
- huwa (هُوَ):
  hū (هُوْ)
  huwwa (هُوَّ) (especially Qaṭarī)
  uhu (أُهُو)
- hiya (هِيَ):
  hī (هِيْ)
  hiyya (هِيَّ) (especially Qaṭarī)
  ihi (إِهِي)
- niḥin (نِحِنْ):
  niḥna (نِحْنَ)
  iḥna (إِحْنَا) (especially Baḥrānī and Qaṭarī)
  ḥina (حِنا) (Qaṭarī)
- intum (إِنْتُمْ):
  intu (إنْتُ)
- hum (هُمْ):
  humma (هُمَّ) (especially Qaṭarī)
  uhum (أُهُمْ)

== Syntax ==
The normal word order in main clauses is the following:

Subject – (Verb) – (Direct Object) – (Indirect Object) – (Adverbials)

The following sentence indicates the normal word order of declarative statements:

/ʔaħmad xarrab l-beːt/
Ahmad ruined-3msg the-house
'Ahmad ruined the house'

When forming interrogative statements, any of these elements can be replaced by interrogative words. Holes (1990) identifies five such words in Gulf Arabic:

- من /min/ ('who')
- /ʃinhu/ (alternatively, وش /weːʃ/, or إيش /eːʃ/) ('what')
- كيف /keːf/ ('how')
- ليش /leːʃ/ (alternatively /ʃulih/) ('why')
- متى /mita/ ('when')

Unless it is desired to stress one of these elements, this order of elements is preserved in the formation of interrogative questions.

/min xarrab il-beːt/ who ruined-3msg the-house
'who ruined the house?'

/ʔaħmad xarrab ʃinhu/
Ahmad ruined-3msg what
'what did Amad ruin?'

/ʔaħmad xarrab il-beːt leːʃ/
Ahmad ruined-3msg the-house why
'why did Ahmad ruin the house?'

When placing emphasis on the questioned element, word order can change. Specifically, the element of a clause can be questioned by moving it, generally to initial position. With the subject (which is normally initial), it is moved to final position:

/xarrab il-beːt min/
ruined-3msg the-house who
'who ruined the house?'

The moved element receives strong stress; in the case of a question word, the intonation is a high fall. When the point is to seek clarification, the element questioned has a high rising intonation.

== See also ==
- Varieties of Arabic
- Peninsular Arabic
- Arabic language
