= Dhofari Arabic =

Arabic variety of Oman

- Zofari Arabic
- Native to: Oman
- Speakers: 130,000 (2020)
- Language family: Afro-Asiatic: Semitic; Central Semitic; Arabic; Peninsular; Dhofari Arabic
- Writing system: Arabic alphabet

Language codes
- ISO 639-3: adf
- Glottolog: dhof1235
- Location of Dhofari Arabic

Dhofari Arabic, also known as Dhofari or Zofari, is a variety of Arabic spoken around Salalah in Oman's Dhofar Governorate. It has the ISO 639-3 language code "adf".

Formerly nomadic and sedentary communities living in the area speak Dhofari Arabic as a first language, second language, or lingua franca, with varying degrees of fluency.

== Phonology ==
=== Consonants ===
		Labial	Interdental		Dental/Alveolar		Palatal	Velar	Uvular	Pharyngeal	Glottal
		Labial	plain	emph.	plain	emph.	Palatal	Velar	Uvular	Pharyngeal	Glottal
Nasal		m			n						
Stop	voiceless				t	tˤ		k	q		ʔ
Stop	voiced	b			d			ɡ			
Fricative	voiceless	f	θ		s	sˤ	ʃ	x		ħ	h
Fricative	voiced		ð	ðˤ	z		(ʒ)	ɣ		ʕ	
Tap					ɾ						
Approximant					l	(lˤ)	j	w			

- [ʒ] only rarely occurs among speakers
- [lˤ] mostly occurs in formal speech.
- /g/ occurs as a reflex of *q in inland and bedouin dialects; /q/ occurs in coastal dialects (Davey).

=== Vowels ===
	Front	Back
Close	i iː	u uː
Mid	eː	oː
Open	a aː	

- A schwa sound [ə] may also occur as a lax realization of short vowels.
- Historical short vowel *a is lengthened to /ā/ in a number of words, e.g. *katab(a) > ktāb 'he wrote', a process called by Richard Davey "iambic vowel lengthening". It does sometimes occur in other positions, perhaps as a result of stress shift.
- Rarely, the historical *ā vowel has been raised and fronted to /ē/ or /ī/, or backed and rounded to /ō/. Raising and fronting of *ā is an important feature in Arabic linguistic history. Both features are unusual in the Arabian Peninsula and are today found in very few lexical items, but are documented in the primary sources of Rhodokanakis (1908,1911) and Davey (2016).

Phoneme	Sound/Allophones
/i/	[i], [ɪ]
/a/	[æ], [ɑ]
/u/	[u], [ʊ]
/aː/	[æː], [ɑː]

== See also ==
- Peninsular Arabic

== Bibliography ==
- Davey, Richard J. (2013). Coastal Dhofārī Arabic: a sketch grammar (PhD thesis). University of Manchester.
- Davey, Richard J. (2016). Coastal Dhofari Arabic: A Sketch Grammar. Studies in Semitic Languages and Linguistics. Vol. 87. Brill. ISBN 978-90-04-31670-6. OCLC 1264422220.
- Rhodokanakis, Nikolaus (1908). Der Vulgärarabische Dialekt im Đofâr (Ẓfâr). OCLC 503848016.
- Mark Shockley (2024). "Ruʾūs al-Jibāl Arabic in Context: A Proposal for an Expanded Typology of Southeastern Arabian Dialects". Journal of Semitic Studies. 69: 1–28.
