= Omani Arabic =

Variety of Peninsular Arabic spoken in Oman

- اللهجة العمانية
- Native to: Oman, United Arab Emirates
- Region: Hajar mountains and nearby coastal areas
- Ethnicity: Omanis
- Speakers: 3.2 million (2020)
- Language family: Afro-Asiatic: Semitic; West Semitic; Central Semitic; Arabic; Peninsular; Gulf; Omani Arabic
- Writing system: Arabic alphabet, Arabic chat alphabet

Language codes
- ISO 639-3: acx
- Glottolog: oman1239
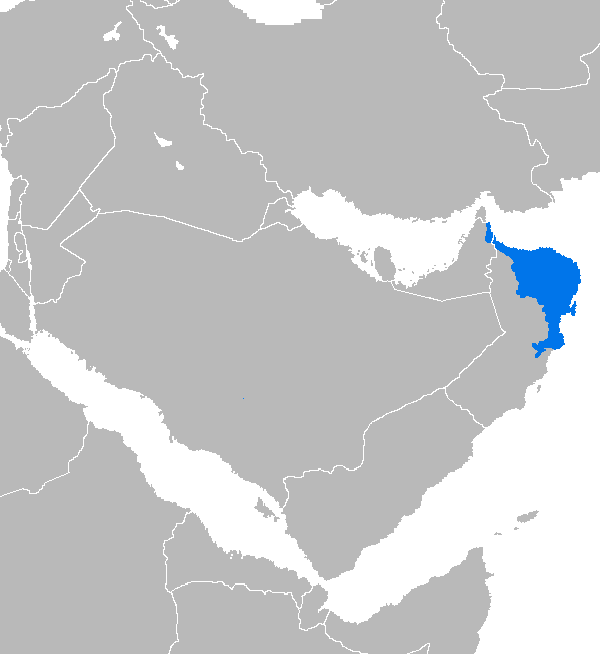
- Areas where Omani Arabic is spoken.

Omani Arabic (Arabic: اللهجة العمانية, romanized: al-Lahjah al-ʻUmānīyah; also known as Omani Hadari Arabic) is a variety of Arabic spoken in the Al Hajar Mountains of Oman and the UAE and in a few neighboring coastal regions. It is the easternmost traditional Arabic dialect. It was formerly spoken by colonists in Kenya and Tanzania, but these days, it mainly remains spoken on the island of Zanzibar.

It is also spoken in parts of East Africa, especially in Zanzibar, due to Oman’s historical presence there. Omani Arabic is considered a variety of Gulf Arabic but includes unique features in pronunciation, vocabulary, and grammar that set it apart from other regional dialects. It varies between rural and urban speakers, and across different regions of Oman. The dialect is used mainly in informal settings, while Modern Standard Arabic is used in schools, media, and official contexts.

== Phonology ==
=== Consonants ===
Omani Arabic has some unique sounds that are different from other Arabic dialects. For example, the letter "qāf" (ق) is often pronounced as a "g" sound. In some regions, older Arabic sounds have been preserved, while in others, changes have occurred due to outside influences. The way people speak can often show where they are from or what social group they belong to.

		Labial	Interdental		Dental/Alveolar		Palatal	Velar	Uvular	Pharyngeal	Glottal
		Labial	plain	emph.	plain	emph.	Palatal	Velar	Uvular	Pharyngeal	Glottal
Nasal		m			n						
Stop	voiceless				t	tˤ	t͡ʃ	k	q		ʔ
Stop	voiced	b			d		(d͡ʒ)	ɡ			
Fricative	voiceless	f	θ		s	sˤ	ʃ	x ~ χ		ħ	h
Fricative	voiced		ð	ðˤ	z			ɣ ~ ʁ		ʕ	
Trill					r	rˤ					
Approximant					l	(ɫ)	j	w			

- Velar fricatives /x, ɣ/ can be heard as uvular sounds [χ, ʁ], in the Muscat dialect.
- /k, ɡ/ can also be heard as palatalized sounds [kʲ, ɡʲ] among the Muscat dialect.
- [ɫ] can be heard as an allophone of /l/, but is rarely phonemic.
- As for most [Omani] dialects, Standard Arabic [d͡ʒ] is replaced with the velar stop /g/ ⟨ج⟩, while [d͡ʒ] is available in some Omani dialects, mainly Bedouin.
- The speakers of Muscat, Salalah and some Batina varieties (e.g. the center of Sohar city), as well as other sedentary dialect speakers, pronounce /q/ ⟨ق⟩ as [q], while the Bedouin dialect speakers pronounce /q/ as [g] and this variable /q/ has been a hallmark for distinguishing Bedouin and Hadari (urban) Arabs for centuries.

=== Vowels ===
	Front	Back
Close	i iː	u uː
Mid	eː	oː
Open	a aː	

- /a/ can be heard as [æ] when preceding /j/ or any non-emphatic consonant. It is heard as back [ɑ] after emphatic sounds, and can then be heard as [ʌ] when shortened. Its long equivalent /aː/, is heard as [ɑː] after emphatic sounds.
- /i/ can be heard as [ɪ] in medial position and as [ɨ] in shortened positions.
- Sounds /u, uː/ are often realized as near-close back sounds [ʊ, ʊː]. /u/ can sometimes be heard as [ɔ] or [o] after emphatics.

=== Sociolinguistic Use ===
Omani Arabic is mainly used in everyday conversation. It is not used for writing in schools or formal settings, where Modern Standard Arabic is preferred. In Zanzibar, older generations still speak the dialect, although Swahili is more common now. The dialect is a key part of national and cultural identity, especially in poetry and oral traditions.

== See also ==
- Varieties of Arabic
- Peninsular Arabic
