= Sanʽani Arabic =

Form of Yemeni Arabic spoken in Sanaa

- Native to: Yemen
- Speakers: 13 million (2020)
- Language family: Afro-Asiatic: Semitic; West Semitic; Central Semitic; Arabic; Peninsular; Yemeni; Sanʽani Arabic
- Writing system: Arabic alphabet

Language codes
- ISO 639-3: ayn
- Glottolog: sana1295
- Distribution of Sanʽani Arabic according to Ethnologue

Sanʽani Arabic is an Arabic dialect spoken in northern Yemen in the city of Sanaa.

== Phonology ==
The Sanaani dialect is distinguished among Yemeni dialects by its use of the [ɡ] sound in the place of the /q/ (qāf ق) used in Modern Standard Arabic.

=== Consonants ===
		Labial	Interdental		Dental/Alveolar		Palatal	Velar	Pharyngeal	Glottal
		Labial	plain	emph.	plain	emph.	Palatal	Velar	Pharyngeal	Glottal
Nasal		m			n					
Stop	voiceless				t	tˤ		k		ʔ
Stop	voiced	b			d		d͡ʒ	ɡ		
Fricative	voiceless	f	θ		s	sˤ	ʃ	x	ħ	h
Fricative	voiced		ð	ðˤ	z			ɣ	ʕ	
Tap					ɾ					
Approximant					l		j	w		

- /tˤ/ is voiced to [dˤ] in initial and intervocalic positions.

=== Vowels ===
	Front	Back
Close	i iː	u uː
Open	a aː	

- The short vowels /a i u/ can have lax allophones of [æ~ɛ, ɪ, ʊ].
- /aː/ within emphatic environments can be heard as back [ɑː].
- In unstressed syllables, Sanaani short vowels may be reduced to [ə].

Sanʽani dialect personal pronouns
Person	Number	Case	
Person	Number	Subject	Object
First	Singular	Anǝ	-nǝ; -nee
First	Plural	Eħnǝ	-na; Eħnǝ
Second	Singular	ant (m.); Anti (f.)	ant, anti; -ak (m.); -eʃ (f.)
Second	Plural	Anto	Anto; -ʊ
Third	Singular	Huː (m.), Hiː (f.)	Ho/-uː (m.), Hiː/ -iː (f.)
Third	Plural	Hom/Om(m.); Hen/en(f.)	Hom/Om (m.); Hen/en (f.)

== Grammar ==
Along with these phonological similarities to other dialects, Sanʽani Arabic also has several unique features. It uses the classical mā in the meaning of "what", as well as in negations. Unlike the classical usage, this mā is used without distinction in verbal and nominal sentences alike. Sanʽani Arabic represents the future aspect with a complex array of prefixes, depending on the person of the verb. For first-person verbs the prefix (ša-) or (‘ad) is used. The derivation of (ša-) is apparently related to the classical (sa-), and (‘ad) is likely an abbreviation of (ba‘d), meaning "after". For all other persons in Sanʽa proper the simple prefix (‘a-) is used, although many of the villages around Sanʽa extend the use of (ša-) for all persons.

=== Syntax ===
Sanʽani syntax differs from other Arabic dialects in a number of ways. It is one of few remaining Arabic dialects to retain the mā af‘al exclamatory sentence type with the meaning "how (adjective)". For instance, mā ajmal, is used to mean "how beautiful", from the adjective jamīl, meaning "beautiful"; a construction it shares with Libyan Arabic and Levantine Arabic.

== Vocabulary ==
The Sanʽani vocabulary is also very distinct and conservative. The classical verb sāra, yasīr is retained with the meaning of "to go" (similar to Moroccan). Shalla, yashill is used to mean "to take/get".

As an example of its distinctiveness, during an appearance of the would-be parliament speaker of Yemen, Abdullah Alahmar, on Al-Jazeera TV some years ago, viewers and the TV host needed a translation of his Yemeni dialect into Standard Arabic in order to understand what he said.

=== Loanwords ===
Ṣanʿānī Arabic	Translation	Etymology	Modern Standard Arabic equivalent
demmeh	domestic cat	Ge'ez: ድመት dəmmät	قِطَّة qiṭṭa
bardag; galaṣ	glass (cup)	Turkish: bardak; English	كَأْس kaʾs
kufteh	meatball	Turkish: köfte	كُرَةُ لَحْم kuratu laḥm
edarapp	to drop	English	سَقَطَ saqata
dappeh	bottle	Hindi: डिब्बा ḍibbā 'container'	قَارُورَة qārūra
eskeh	Allow me (informal)	እስኪ əskī 'please'	إِسْمَح لِي ismaḥ lī
nahi	OK	Arabic: نهى 'done'	حسناً ḥasanan
dēmeh	kitchen	ديمة 'cottage'	مَطْبَخ maṭbaḵ
saykal	bicycle	Hindi: साइकिल sāikil	دَرَّاجَة darrāja

== See also ==
- Varieties of Arabic
- Yemeni Arabic
