= Taʽizzi-Adeni Arabic =

Arabic variety of Yemen

- Southern Yemeni Arabic
- لهجة تعزية عدنية
- Native to: Yemen
- Region: Taiz, Aden
- Speakers: 12 million (2021)
- Language family: Afro-Asiatic: Semitic; West Semitic; Central Semitic; Arabic; Southern; Yemeni Arabic; Taʽizzi-Adeni Arabic
- Dialects: Taʽizzi Arabic; Adeni Arabic
- Writing system: Arabic alphabet

Language codes
- ISO 639-3: acq
- Glottolog: taiz1242

Taʽizzi-Adeni Arabic (لهجة تعزية عدنية lahga Taʿizziyya-ʿAdaniyya) or Southern Yemeni Arabic is a dialect of Arabic spoken primarily in Yemen. The dialect itself is further sub-divided into the regional vernaculars of Ta'izzi, spoken in Ta'izz, and Adeni, spoken in Aden, while both are spoken in Djibouti.

The languages that existed in this region prior to the arrival of Arabic have had long lasting impacts upon the modern iteration of Ta’izzi-Adeni. Owing to this history, and a relative degree of geographic isolation, it has developed certain, distinctive phonological and vocabularic variations.

== Classification ==
Ta’izzi-Adeni Arabic is classified as a dialect of Yemeni Arabic, itself a variation of the broader Peninsular Arabic, and is native to the areas of Southwestern Yemen.

In 2016, it was estimated that the Ta’izzi-Adeni dialect was spoken by approximately 10.48 million people worldwide. In the regions where Ta’izzi-Adeni is spoken, for writing and pre-prepared speech, the more standardised Modern Standard Arabic often supersedes Ta’izzi-Adeni as the language of choice, as is the case with most dialects across the Arab world. For this reason, Arabic and its various dialects are classified as a diglossia; a language wherein the spoken form and the written form are divergent.

=== Varieties ===
The Governorates of the Republic of Yemen

There are two further sub-divisions of Ta’izzi-Adeni, namely Ta’izzi and Adeni. The Ta’izzi dialect is spoken chiefly in the Yemeni Governorate of Ta’izz and the neighbouring governorate of Ibb, whereas Adeni is spoken further south, within Aden itself and the immediate, outlying, rural areas. Comparing these two sub-divisions, there are certain, distinctive variations, owing largely to the geography and history of the respective regions.

Historically, Aden has been a trade port on the Indian Ocean and a stopping point on the Silk Road. Even today Aden continues to be the largest dockyard servicing the country of Yemen, with the three largest ports all located within the broader city. Due to the port's position on the edge of the Indian Ocean and relatively near to the Red Sea, Aden along with its surroundings was conquered by the United Kingdom in 1831 to be used as a trading port on the route between India, another of the United Kingdom's former colonies, and Great Britain itself. The port therefore saw transitory migration from both the UK and India under British rule and hence has had significantly more contact with the different languages and cultures than the more insular and isolated Ta’izz. As a result, the Adeni Arabic dialect has a higher prevalence of loan words, in particular words of both English and Indian descent, than most other dialects of Arabic.

== History ==
The contemporary Arabic language originated further north than Yemen, in and around the region of Hejaz, and arrived to the modern area of south-western Yemen following the early Muslim conquests of the Arabian Peninsula.

Prior to the advent of Arabic, a cluster of languages collectively known as “Old South Arabian” were spoken in the modern region encompassed by the Ta’izzi-Adeni dialect. This group of languages were closely related to each other and, like modern Arabic, were classified within the Semitic language family. From the limited existing fragments and records of these now-extinct languages, as well as by analysing their modern, surviving descendants, scholars have attempted to reconstruct and categorise their features. From what has been managed to be reconstructed, it appears that the languages have left a significant impression on the Ta’izzi-Adeni dialect and are responsible for many of the unique features of both the dialect's phonology and vocabulary.

Of the two main classifications of Arabic dialects, namely sedentary and nomadic (sometimes erroneously referred to as Bedouin), the Ta’izzi-Adeni dialect belongs to the former category. This distinction has been drawn as considerable differences in both phonology and vocabulary have been observed between the dialects spoken by the townships of the Arabian Peninsula, and those dialects spoken by its formerly nomadic peoples. As the area where Ta’izzi-Adeni is spoken, South Western Yemen, is one of the few areas of the Arabian Peninsula that has sufficient agriculturally productivity to allow for sedentary lifestyles, the inhabitants of this area lived comparatively more sedentary lives. Hence, these lifestyles are reflected in the sounds and vocabulary of the dialect.

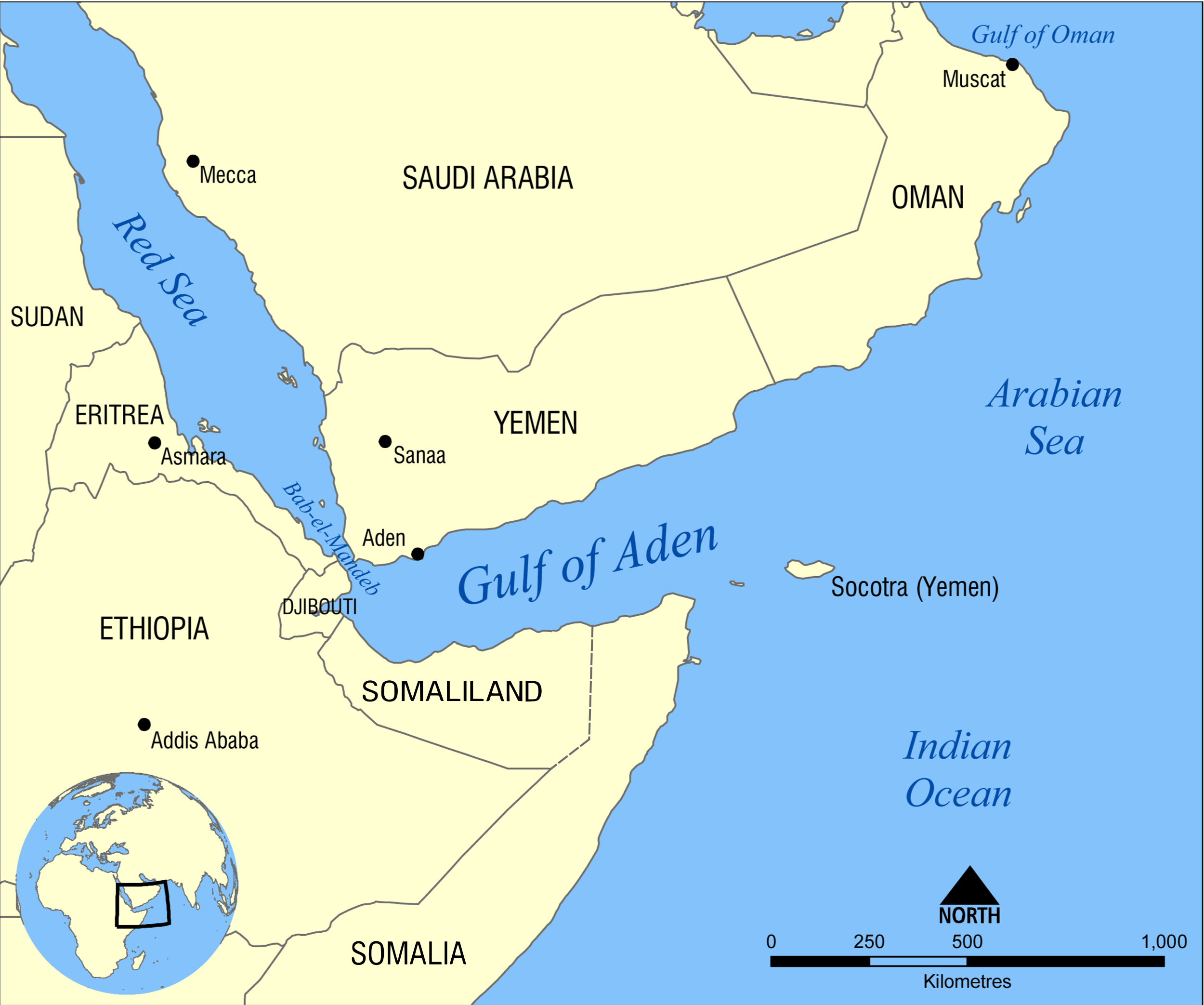
Map depicting the location of Eritrea relative to Yemen and Djibouti.

Additionally, there is a sizeable community of Ta’izzi-Adeni Arabic speakers of predominantly Jewish faith, who inhabit the East African nation of Eritrea. Historically, the region of Aden had maintained a strong Jewish presence going back an estimated 2000 years to the time of the predominantly Jewish Himyarite Kingdom of South Arabia. These Adeni Jews spoke the local language, Ta’izzi-Adeni Arabic, and were not considered ethnically or culturally distinct from the Muslim population. Following the British conquest of Aden, and the establishment of the Aden Protectorate in 1839, these Adeni Jews, also referred to as Adenites, began to be identified as a separate ethnicity to the other inhabitants of the area, despite their shared history and language. The British conquest also led to an increase in immigration of Jews from other areas of the Arabian Peninsula to the recently established Aden Protectorate. Under British rule, many Adeni Jews, speaking Ta’izzi-Adeni Arabic, established commercial enterprises and communities in the nearby Italian territory of Eritrea. In 1947, following the announcement of the United Nations plan to partition the region of Palestine, large scale riots and protests occurred throughout the British Aden Protectorate, resulting in the deaths of 82 Adeni Jews, as well as the destruction of synagogues and Jewish owned businesses. Following this, there was a large scale exodus of the Adeni Jews, as those that remained, fled Aden en masse, settling predominantly in the priorly established communities in Eritrea; at that time, a part of Ethiopia. For this reason, there still exists a relatively sizeable community of Ta’izzi-Adeni Arabic speakers within the modern state of Eritrea.

== Phonology ==
=== Consonants ===
		Labial	Dental/Alveolar		Palatal	Velar	Uvular	Pharyngeal	Glottal
		Labial	plain	emph.	Palatal	Velar	Uvular	Pharyngeal	Glottal
Nasal		m	n						
Stop	voiceless		t	tˤ	k		q		ʔ
Stop	voiced	b	d	dˤ	ɡ				
Fricative	voiceless	f	s	sˤ	ʃ	x ~ χ		ħ	h
Fricative	voiced		z		ʒ	ɣ ~ ʁ		ʕ	
Trill			r						
Approximant			l		j	w			

- Velar stop sounds /k, ɡ/ can also be heard as palatal stop sounds [c, ɟ] among other speakers.

Due to a somewhat isolated position amidst the mountainous Yemeni highlands, as well as the enduring impacts of the local, pre-Arabic languages on speech and phonology, Ta’izzi-Adeni has developed certain, distinctive features that distinguish it from the multitude of vernaculars spoken throughout the Arab world. Additionally, there are certain elements of the phonology of the Ta’izzi-Adeni dialect that are not unique to the dialect itself, but shared amongst the other dialects of Yemeni Arabic, differentiating this Yemeni cluster of dialects from the Literary Arabic.

Some of the most pronounced phonological variations are the continued use of inter dental fricatives, a consonant sound pronounced with the tip of the tongue touching the teeth, such as the “th” sound in modern English. Over the course of history, the majority of Arabic speakers have dropped this sound, instead opting to merge it with the dental stop, a sound wherein the tongue blocks the flow of air, English has many such examples, with the “t”, “d”, and “k” sounds all exhibiting this quality.

Another such example of a key phonological difference between Ta’izzi-Adeni and Classical Arabic, is the replacement of the voiced palatal plosive with the voiced velar plosive. The difference between these two sounds is not aptly represented with the English alphabet, as both are represented by “g” in the English alphabet. However, the voiced palatal plosive is the sound of the “g” in the word “geese”, whereas the voiced velar plosive is the more conventional “g”, such as those in the word “gaggle”. Whilst most dialects of Arabic have done away with the Classical Arabic voiced palatal plosive, and it only remains in a select few scattered dialects across the Arab world, Ta’izzi-Adeni is one of the few that has replaced this sound with the voiced velar plosive, as most regional variations of Arabic have instead opted to replace it with the voiced palato alveolar sibilant affricate, a sound represented by the letter “j” in the English alphabet.

Whilst the two dialects of Ta’izzi and Adeni have numerous, shared features in respect to their phonologies, there exist distinctive elements within both dialects. Ta’izzi uses a voiced uvular plosive (in English, this sound does not exist, however, it is akin to a more guttural “k”) to vocalise the Arabic letter, “qaf”. By comparison, most varieties of Arabic utilise either the voiced velar plosive or the voiceless uvular plosive (respectively represented by the letters “k” and “g” in English) for this letter.

Further, the two emphatics of Classical Arabic are pharyngealized in the Ta’izzi-Adeni dialect, meaning that the pharynx is constricted during articulation. Due to vast divergences in the pronunciation across the Arab world and an indeterminate history, it is uncertain how one of these emphatics, the Classical Arabic letter “Ḍād” was originally vocalised. It is likely, however, that the letter was used to represent a pharyngealised voiced alveolar lateral fricative, phonetically represented as [ɮˤ]. This letter, along with the pharyngealised voiced dental fricative of Classical Arabic, represented by the phonetic symbol [ðˤ], comprise the two emphatics of Classical Arabic . In the dialect of Ta’izzi-Adeni, these sounds have been merged, yet have still maintained their pharyngealization, to become the pharyngealised voiced alveolar stop, [dˤ]. This is in contrast to the extant languages of Modern South Arabian, from which Ta’izzi-Adeni has been significantly influenced, as in Modern South Arabian these sounds have been glottalized, wherein the glottis is closed whist articulating a sound.

=== Vowels ===
	Front	Back
Close	i iː	u uː
Mid	eː	oː
Open	a aː	

- Sounds /i, a/ are heard as [ɨ, ɑ] after emphatic consonants, shortened forms are heard as [ɨ̞, ʌ]. In word-medial position, they can be heard as [ɪ, ä] and [ä] with a shortened form heard as [ɒ].
- Sounds /a, aː/ and /u, uː/ can be heard as [æ, æː] and [ʊ, ʊː] when preceding more front-articulated consonants.
- Sounds /e, eː/ and /o, oː/ can also be heard as [ɛ, ɛː] and [ɔ, ɔː] in various other positions.

== Vocabulary ==
Like many dialects, there are elements of the vocabulary of Ta’izzi-Adeni that distinguish it from other dialects. These differences have arisen largely due to the aforementioned, historical and geographic realities of South Western Yemen.

Some examples of discrepancies and differences between Ta’izzi-Adeni and Modern Standard Arabic are transliterated below, with an accompanying English translation :

Comparison of Ta'izzi-Adeni Arabic and Modern Standard Arabic
Ta'izzi-Adeni Arabic	Modern Standard Arabic	Direct English Translation
niḍām	niẓām (نظام)	system
igtimāʕ	ijtimāʕ (اجتماع), liqāʔ (لقاء)	meeting
ōbah	iʕtanā (اعتنى)	to take care of
mudīr	mudīr (مدير)	director
ʔaḥyānan / baʕḍ alʔaḥyān	ʔaḥyānan (أحيانا)	sometimes
sāfar	sāfara (سافر)	to travel
saʔal	saʔala (سأل)	to ask

Further, there exists distinctive, vocabularic differences between the two sub-dialects of Adeni and Ta’izzi. One such example is the use of loan words in both dialects, as Adeni Arabic has a higher prevalence of loan words than most dialects of Arabic. The proposed reasons for this difference are twofold. One factor influencing the integration of loan words into any Arabic dialect is the attitude of the dialect's speakers to the original language from which the loan word was derived. If speakers view the language and the process of integration with hostility, they are more inclined to resist the perceived linguistic takeover. However those speakers who are ambivalent towards or even welcome the change are more inclined to use loan words from foreign languages; as these individuals perceive the loan words to be somewhat prestigious. A further factor influencing the degree to which loan words are incorporated into dialects is the familiarity of individuals with foreign languages. Speakers who possess a comprehensive understanding of foreign languages are more likely to insert loan words into their vernacular as a substitute for a local word or to signify a concept that did not previously exist in their regional dialect.

As Aden was previously under the control of the United Kingdom, speakers of Adeni were, and are, more likely to have encountered both English and the various languages of India. Therefore, today the southern region of Yemen, including Aden, remains the epicentre of English within the country, and possesses the greatest number of individuals with a fluency in the English language. Thus, as the Adeni dialect has a greater proportion of speakers who are both more familiar with English, and less hostile to perceived, foreign linguistic invasions, the use of loan words has become more prevalent in Adeni Arabic than most other Arabic dialects, including Ta’izzi Arabic.

Due to the southern region of Yemen status as a former protectorate of the British Empire, with English settlers frequently voyaging to and even inhabiting Aden and its surrounds, English became and has maintained its position as the unofficial language of commerce and education in Aden. Further, due to the Adeni dialects pre-eminence within Yemen as a source of English vernacular, the other dialects in its vicinity, such as Ta’izzi and the neighbouring Hadhrami, have received English loan words into their speech, not directly through English speakers, but indirectly through Adeni Arabic speakers.

== See also ==
- Varieties of Arabic
- Yemeni Arabic
