= Najdi Arabic =

Variety of Arabic spoken in the Najd region of Saudi Arabia

- نجدي (Najdi)
- Native to: Saudi Arabia, Jordan, Iraq, Syria
- Native speakers: 19 million (2018–2023)
- Language family: Afro-Asiatic: Semitic; West Semitic; Central Semitic; Arabic; Peninsular; Najdi Arabic
- Writing system: Arabic alphabet

Language codes
- ISO 639-3: ars
- Glottolog: najd1235

Najdi Arabic (Arabic: اللهجة النجدية, romanized: al-lahja an-najdiyya, Najdi Arabic: نجدي, Najdi pronunciation: [nadʒˈdi]) is the group of Arabic varieties originating from the Najd region of Saudi Arabia. Outside of Saudi Arabia, it is also the main Arabic variety spoken in the Syrian Desert of Iraq, Jordan, and Syria (with the exception of Palmyra oasis and settlements dotting the Euphrates, where Mesopotamian Arabic is spoken) as well as the westernmost part of Kuwait.

Najdi Arabic can be divided into four region-based groups:

1. Northern Najdi, spoken by the tribe of Shammar and surrounding tribes in Ha'il Region in Najd and the Syrian Desert.
2. Mixed northern-central Najdi of Al-Qassim, Northern Riyadh region of Sudair, and the tribe of Dhafeer around Kuwait.
3. Central Najdi, spoken in the city of Riyadh and surrounding towns and farming communities, and by the tribe of Anazah in the Syrian Desert. This dialect group includes the modern urban dialect of Riyadh, which has become the prestige dialect of Saudi Arabia.
4. Southern Najdi, spoken by the tribes of Qahtan and Banu Yam, including in the Rub' al-Khali and Najran, as well as the branches of Banu Yam, Ajman and Al Murrah in Eastern Arabia.

== Phonology ==
=== Consonants ===
Below is the table of the consonant phonemes of Najdi Arabic.

Consonant phonemes of Najdi
		Labial	Dental	Denti-alveolar/Alveolar		Palatal	Velar	Pharyngeal	Glottal
		Labial	Dental	plain	emphatic	Palatal	Velar	Pharyngeal	Glottal
Nasal		m		n					
Occlusive	voiceless			t	tˤ		k		ʔ
Occlusive	voiced	b		d		d͡ʒ	ɡ		
Fricative	voiceless	f	θ	s	sˤ	ʃ	x	ħ	h
Fricative	voiced		ð	z	ðˤ		ɣ	ʕ	
Trill				r					
Approximant				l	(ɫ)	j	w		

Phonetic notes:

- /ɡ/ is the modern reflex of earlier /q/ ⟨ق⟩, though [q] can appear in a few loanwords from Modern Standard Arabic and proper names, as in القرآن [alqurˈʔaːn] ('Quran') and قانون [qaːnuːn] ('law').
- The distinction between the Old Arabic [dˤ] ⟨ﺽ⟩ and [ðˤ] ⟨ظ⟩ was completely lost in Najdi Arabic, and both are realised as [ðˤ]. /tˤ/ is sometimes voiced.
- The phonemes /ɣ/ ⟨غ⟩ and /x/ ⟨خ⟩ are in free variation with uvular fricatives [ʁ] and [χ] respectively.
- Northern and central dialects feature affricates [t͡s] and [d͡z] as allophonic variants of the velar stops /k/ and /ɡ/, respectively, particularly in the context of front vowels e.g. كَلْب [t͡salb] ('dog'). Dialect leveling as a result of influence from the Riyadh-based prestige varieties has led to the affricate allophones becoming increasingly less common among younger speakers.
- Historically, /ʔ/ was deleted. It now appears only in borrowings from Classical Arabic; word-medially, this deletion comes along with the lengthening of short vowels.
- The phones [p] ⟨پ⟩ and [v] ⟨ڤ⟩ (not used by all speakers) are not considered to be part of the phonemic inventory, as they exist only in foreign words and can be pronounced as /b/ and /f/ respectively depending on the speaker.

=== Vowels ===
Vowels of Najdi Arabic
	Front		Central		Back	
	short	long	short	long	short	long
Close	ɪ	iː			ʊ	uː
Mid		eː				oː
Open			a	aː		

Unless adjacent to /ɣ x h ħ ʕ/, /a/ is raised in open syllables to [i], [ɨ], or [u], depending on neighboring sounds. Remaining /a/ may become fronted to [æ~ɛ] in the context of front sounds, as well as adjacent to the pharyngeals /ħ ʕ/.

Najdi Arabic exhibits the so-called gahawa syndrome, insertion of epenthetic /a/ after (/h x, ɣ ħ, ʕ/). For example, [gahwah] > [gahawah].

When short /a/ appears in an open syllable that is followed by a nonfinal light syllable, it is deleted. For example, /saħab-at/ is realized as [sˈħa.bat]. This, combined with the gahawa syndrome can make underlying sequence of /a/ and a following guttural consonant (/h x, ɣ ħ, ʕ/) to appear metathesized, e.g. /ʔistaʕʒal/ ('got in a hurry') [ʔistˈʕaʒal].

Short high vowels are deleted in non-final open syllables, such as /tirsil-uːn/ ('you [m. sg.] send') [tirsˈluːn].

There is both limited distributional overlap and free variation between [i] and [u], with the latter being more likely in the environment of bilabials, pharyngealized consonants, and /r/.

The mid vowels /eː oː/ are typically monophthongs, though they can be pronounced as diphthongs when preceding a plosive, e.g. /beːt/ ('house') [beit]. [ei]

== Grammar ==
=== Morphology ===
Najdi Arabic sentence structure can have the word order VSO and SVO, however, VSO usually occurs more often. NA morphology is distinguished by three categories which are: nouns ism, verb fial, and particle harf. Ism means name in Arabic and it corresponds to nouns and adjectives in English. Fial means action in Arabic and it corresponds to verbs. Harf means letter and corresponds to pronouns, demonstratives, prepositions, conjunctions and articles.

Verbs are inflected for number, gender, person, tense, aspect and transitives. Nouns show number (singular and plural) and gender (masculine and feminine).

Complementizers in NA have three different classes which are: relative particle, declarative particle, and interrogative particles. The three different complementizers that are used in Najdi Arabic are: illi, in, itha.

=== Negation ===
Two particles are used in negation, which are: ma and la. These particles come before the verb in verbal sentences. ma is used with all verbal sentences but la is used with imperative verb forms indicating present and future tense.

=== Tense/Aspect System ===
Najdi Arabic exhibits a number of discourse particles whose main function is to mark different tenses and aspects, including the perfective, imperfective, and progressive aspects. These speech particles "form a link between the time of occurrence of the verb and a point of reference not concurrent with it". cites six "relative time markers":

- [d͡zid] ('already')
- [ʕaːd] ('still, anymore')
- [maː ʕaːd] ('no longer, no more')
- [baʕad] ('still')
- [maː baʕad] ('not yet')
- [taww-] ('just')

Most of these discourse particles are preverbal, yet a few of them can show up in non-verbal sentences. These discourse particles have a number of features when they show up in speech:

1. The particle [taww] occurs with the perfective and active particle and is almost always followed by a personal pronoun suffix.
2. A few of these particles are not pre-verbal, i.e., they can show up with non-verbal sentences.
3. Their function is similar, "setting the time of occurrence of the situation referred to by the sentence in relation to a point of reference".
4. The particles [ʕaːd] and [baʕad] can sometimes have a suffix in the affirmative.
5. The particle [maː ʕaːd] occurs with the perfective and imperfective.
6. The particles [ʕaːd] and [baʕad] occur with the imperfective and the active participle.
7. The particle [maː baʕad] occurs with the perfective.

The following examples illustrate the use of these discourse particles in Najdi Arabic:

- [ʕaːd]

ʕaːd-ik bduwi
still.2SG bedouin
'you are still a bedouin'

ħaːmid ʕaːd ʃiftih
Hamid still see.PERF.3SG
'have you seen Hamid any more?'

- [maʕaːd]

leːn sˤirt maː ʕaːd aħiss biʔajj farɡ
until become.PERF.1SG NEG longer 1SG-feel-IMPERF any difference
'until I could no longer feel any difference'

maː ʕaːd ʃiftih
NEG longer see.PERF.3SG
'I have not seen him anymore'

- [baʕad]

baʕad-hum jsulifuːn
still-3PL talk.IMPERF.3PL
'they are still talking'

baʕad-hum hnaj'ja
still.3PL here
'they are still here'

- [maː baʕad]

maː baʕad ligeːt aħdin jwasˤsˤilha
NEG yet find.PERF.1SG anyone send.IMPERF.3SG
'I have not yet found anyone to send it'

ila l-ħiːn maː 'baʕad garrart ʃajj
to now NEG yet decide.PERF.3SG thing
'up till now I have not yet decided anything'

- [taww]

taww nuːrah hnajja
just Nurah here
'Nurah was just here'

taww-ih d͡ʒaːj
just.3SG arrive.IMPERF.3SG
'he has just arrived'

In addition to these, [d͡zid] ('already') may occur before the main verb to convey that something has been done but is no longer the case (equivalent to the experiential perfect in English). There are a number of meanings of [d͡zid] depending on context:

- 'had done' when occurring with a past reference point
- 'has done' when occurring with a present reference point
- 'already' when the action has actually occurred previously to the time of utterance
- 'never' with a negative sentence that has a present reference point
- 'ever' with an interrogative sentence with a present reference point.

The following examples illustrate the use of the particle [d͡zid]:

hu d͡zid ritsib
he EXP ride.PERF.3SG
'He has ridden'

int d͡zid d͡ʒiː-ta-hum gabul
you already come.PERF.2SG.3PL before
'You have visited them before' (I think)'

maː d͡zid ʃif-t-ih
NEG EXP see.PERF.1SG-3SG
'I have never seen him'

ana laħaɡ-t-kum laːkin d͡zid taʕaddeː-tu l-kullijjah
I follow.PERF-1SG-2PL but EXP pass.PER-.2PL DEF-college
'I came after you, but you had already turned the corner of the college'

In addition, the progressive aspect is marked by the particle [qaʕid] ('to sit'). The particle [qaʕid] surfaces with a verb in the imperfective aspect but cannot surface with a verb in the perfective aspect, as shown in the following two sentences:

ɡaʔid ja-ɡra al-kitaab
AUX 3SG.MASC-read.IMPERF DEF.book
'he is reading the book'

*ɡaʔid ɡara al-kitaab
AUX read.PERF.3SG DEF-book
'he is reading the book'

The progressive aspect in Najdi Arabic (as well as other dialects is expressed by the imperfective form of the verb, often preceded by the active particle [qaʕid].Holes (1990) The following examples to illustrate the use of [qaʕid] to express the progressive aspect:

qaʕid aːlʕab kuːrah
sit.ACT.PTCP.3SG.M play.IPFV.3SG.M soccer
'I am playing soccer'

qaʕid ʔamʃiː
sit.ACT.PTCP.3SG.M walk.IPFV.3SG.M
'I am walking'

== See also ==
- Varieties of Arabic
- Peninsular Arabic

== Bibliography ==
- Al Aloula, Meshael (2021), The Emergence of a Progressive Aspect in Najdi Arabic, George Mason University
- Al-Mozainy, Hamza Q (1981). Vowel Alternations in a Bedouin Hijazi Arabic Dialect: Abstractness and Stress (Thesis). Austin, Texas: University of Texas, Austin.
- Al-Rojaie, Y. (2013), "Regional dialect leveling in Najdi Arabic: The case of the deaffrication of [k] in the Qaṣīmī dialect", Language Variation and Change, 25 (1): 43–63, doi:10.1017/s0954394512000245, S2CID 145173628
- Al Motairi, Sarah Soror (2015), An Optimality-Theoretic Analysis of Syllable Structure in Qassimi Arabic
- Alothman, Ebtesam (2012), Digital Vernaculars: An Investigation of Najdi Arabic in Multilingual Synchronous Computer-Mediated Communication (PDF), University of Manchester, pp. 96–121
- Alshammari, Ahmad; Alshammari, Wafi Fhaid (2020), "The Word gid in Najdi Arabic: An Evidentiality Head", Linguistic Forum, 2 (4): 33–41, doi:10.53057/linfo/2020.2.4.5, ISSN 2707-5273, S2CID 236846500
- Holes, Clive (1990), Gulf Arabic, London: Routledge
- Ingham, Bruce (1986), "Notes on the Dialect of the Āl Murra of Eastern and Southern Arabia", Bulletin of the School of Oriental and African Studies, University of London, 49 (2): 271–291, doi:10.1017/s0041977x00024162, S2CID 128624297
- Ingham, Bruce (1994), Najdi Arabic: Central Arabian, Amsterdam: John Benjamins, ISBN 9789027238016
- Lewis Jr., Robert (2013), Complementizer Agreement in Najdi Arabic (PDF), University of Kansas, archived from the original (PDF) on 2018-06-19
- McCarthy, John J. (2007), Hidden Generalizations: Phonological Opacity in Optimality Theory, London: Equinox Publishing Ltd., ISBN 9781845530518
