= Peninsular Arabic =

Varieties of Arabic of the Arabian Peninsula

- Arabian Arabic
- عربية شبه الجزيرة
- Region: Arabian Peninsula
- Native speakers: 77 million (2018–2023)
- Language family: Afro-Asiatic: Semitic; West Semitic; Central Semitic; Arabic; Peninsular Arabic
- Dialects: Gulf; Bahrani; Omani; Hejazi; Shihhi; Dhofari; Yemeni; Bedawi; Najdi; Bareqi
- Writing system: Arabic script

Language codes
- ISO 639-3: Variously: abv – Bahrani Arabic adf – Dhofari Arabic avl – Eastern Egyptian Bedawi Arabic afb – Gulf Arabic ayh – Hadhrami Arabic acw – Hejazi Arabic ars – Najdi Arabic acx – Omani Arabic ayn – Sanʽani Arabic ssh – Shihhi Arabic acq – Taʽizzi-Adeni Arabic
- Glottolog: arab1393

Peninsular Arabic (Arabic: عربية شبه الجزيرة) are the varieties of Arabic spoken throughout the Arabian Peninsula. This includes the countries of Saudi Arabia, Yemen, Oman, United Arab Emirates, Kuwait, Bahrain, Qatar, Southern Iran, Southern Iraq and Jordan.

The modern dialects spoken in the Arabian Peninsula are closer to Classical Arabic than elsewhere in the Arab world. Some of the local dialects have retained many archaic features lost in other dialects, such as the conservation of nunation for indeterminate nouns. They retain most Classical syntax and vocabulary but still have some differences from Classical Arabic like the other dialects.

Distribution of dialects in the Arabian Peninsula

== Varieties ==
Approximate historical distribution of Semitic languages

Ingham and Holes both note the existence of two peninsular dialect groups:

1. A southwestern dialect group that includes most of the dialects of South Arabia, stretching as far north as Al Bahah. Holes generalizes it to a "sedentary" or "peripheral" group that also includes dialects of historically sedentary populations on the Persian Gulf coast, such as Omani Arabic and Bahrani Arabic. These dialects share certain syntactic features with Modern South Arabian languages.
2. A central-eastern dialect group originating in the center, that spread with the migration of Arab tribes. This group includes the dialects of most bedouin tribes in the peninsula, spanning an area extending from the Syrian Desert to the Empty Quarter. Its most notable examples are Najdi Arabic and Gulf Arabic.

The following varieties are usually noted:

- Yemeni Arabic, displays a past conjugation with the very archaic -k suffix, as in southern Semitic languages. The dialect of Aden has /ɡʲ/ > [ɡ] as in Cairo.
- Hejazi Arabic, spoken in Saudi Arabia along the coast of the Red Sea, especially in the cities of Mecca and Jeddah. Strictly speaking, there are two distinct dialects spoken in the Hejaz region, one by the Bedouin rural population and another by the urban population in cities such as Jeddah, Mecca, Medina, Taif and Yanbu. The Bedouin varieties are part of the Najdi dialect group.
- Najdi Arabic, spoken in the center of the peninsula in Saudi Arabia and is characterized by a shift of /q/ to /ɡ/ and affrication of /k/ and /ɡ/ to [ts] and [dz], respectively, in certain contexts. As defined by Ingham, this dialect group also includes many bedouin varieties outside Najd, extending as far as Najran to the south, Syria to the north, Hejaz and Eastern Arabia.
- Dhofari Arabic, Spoken in Dhofar in southern Arabia, spoken in Yemen, Oman, and the surrounding regions.
- Gulf Arabic (excluding Omani Arabic, Dhofari Arabic and Bahrani Arabic), spoken in the coast of the Persian Gulf.
- Bahrani Arabic, spoken in Bahrain, Eastern Saudi Arabia, and Oman.

The following table compares the Arabic terms between Saudi dialects of urban Hejazi and urban Najdi in addition to the dialect of the Harb tribe with its tribal area (Najdi, urban Hejazi and bedouin Hejazi groups) which shows a correlation and differences between those dialects:

Comparison between a number of dialects in Saudi Arabia
Term	Standard Arabic	Urban Hejazi	Ḥarb tribe (Hejazi -Urban groups)	Ḥarb tribe (Hejazi -Bedouin groups)	Ḥarb tribe (Najdi)	Urban Najdi
"water"	ماء māʼ	موية mōya	ما mā or موية mōya			موية mōya
"what?"	ماذا māḏā	إيش ʾēš	ويش wēš or وش weš			وش wiš
"I want"	أريد ʼurīd	أبغى ʼabḡa or rarely أبى ʼaba	أبى ʼaba	أبي ʼabi		
"bread"	خُبْز ḵubz	خُبْز ḵubuz or عيش ʿēš	عيش ʿayš	خِبْز ḵibz		
"run"	يَرْكُض yarkuḍu or يَجْرِي yajrī	يِجْري yijri	يَجْرِي yajri	يَرْكُض yarkiẓ (يَرْكِظ)		
"now"	الآن alʼān	دحين daḥīn or daḥēn	ذحين daḥīn	هالحين hal-ḥīn		الحين il-ḥīn
"also"	أيْضًا ʾayḍan or كَذَٰلِكَ ka-ḏālika	كمان kamān or برضه barḍu	كمان kamān or برضه barẓu (برظه)	كَذَٰلِكَ ka-ḏālik		بَعَد baʿad
"coffee"	قَهْوَة qahwa	قَهْوَة gahwa	قْهَوَة ghawa			قْهَوَة ghawa or قَهْوَة gahwa
"they said"	قالوا qālū	قالوا gālu	قالوا gālaw			قالوا gālaw or قالوا gālu
"cows"	بَقَر baqar	بَقَر bagar	بُقَر bugar			بِقَر bigar
"neck"	رَقَبة raqaba	رَقَبة ragaba	رْقُبة rguba			رْقَبة rgaba
"little"	قَليل qalīl	قَليل galīl	قِليل gilīl			
"strong"	قَوِيّ qawiyy	قَوي gawi	قُوي guwi			
"talked to you"	كَلَّمَكَ kallamaka	كَلَّمَك kallamak	كَلَّمْك kallamk			
"take!"	خُذْ ḵuḏ	خُذْ ḵud (خُد)	خُذْ ḵuḏ	خِذْ ḵiḏ		
"all"	كُلّ kull	كُلّ kull		كِل kill		
"got bigger"	كَبُرَ kabura	كِبِر kibir		كِبَر kibar		
"he drank"	شَرِب šarib	شِرِب širib		شِرَب širab		
"I said"	قُلْت qult	قُلْت gult		قِلْت gilt		
"tomb"	قَبْر qabr	قَبُر gabur		قبر gabir		
"palace"	قَصر qaṣr	قَصُر gaṣur		قَصِر gaṣir		
"poverty"	فَقْر faqr	فَقِر fagir or فَقُر fagur		فَقِر fagir		
"it dried"	يَبِس yabis	يِبِس yibis		يِبَس yibas		
"say!"	قُل qul	قول gūl		قِل gil or rarely قول gūl		
"go!"	اِذْهَب iḏhab	روح rūḥ		رح riḥ or rarely روح rūḥ		
“he found”	لقي laqiya	لقي ligi		لقى liga		
“she forgot”	نَسِيَت nasiyat	نِسْيَت nisyat	نست nisat			
"where?"	أين ʼayn	فين fēn	وين wēn			
"early morning"	ضُحَى ḍuḥā	ضَحى ḍaḥa	ضَحى ẓaḥa (ظَحى)			
"we were"	كُنَّا kunnā	كُنَّا kunna	كِنَّا kinna			
"he inhabited"	سَكَن sakan	سَكَن sakan	سِكَن sikan			
"he told the truth"	صَدَق ṣadaq	صَدَق ṣadag	صِدَق ṣidag			
"he knows"	يَعْرِف yaʿrif	يِعْرِف yiʿrif	يْعَرِف yʿarif			
"he wrote"	كَتَبَ katab	كَتَب katab	كِتَب kitab			
"he enters"	يَدْخُل yadḵul	يِدْخُل yidḵul	يَدْخُل yadḵul	يَدْخِل yadḵil		
"he writes"	يَكْتُبُ yaktub	يِكْتُب yiktub	يَكْتِب yaktub	يَكْتِب yaktib or يْكَتِب ykatib		
"she sits"	تَقْعُد taqʿud	تِقْعُد tigʿud	تَقْعُد tagʿud	تَقْعِد tagʿid		
"he woke up"	صَحِيَ ṣaḥiya or صحا ṣaḥā	صِحِي ṣiḥi	صَحَا ṣaḥa			
"dig"	اِحْفِرْ iḥfir	اَحْفُر aḥfur	اِحْفِرْ iḥfir			
"leave!"	خَلِّ ḵalli	خَلِّي ḵalli	خل ḵall			
"big"	كَبير kabīr	كَبير kabīr	كِبير kibīr			
"truth"	حَقيقة ḥaqīqa	حَقيقة ḥagīga	حِقيقة ḥigīga			
"we"	نَحْن naḥnu	احنا iḥna or نحنا niḥna	حنا ḥinna			
"them"	هُم hum	َّهُم humma	هُم hum			
"this"	هذا hāḏā	هذا hāda (هدا)	هذا hāḏa			
"we count"	نَحْسِبُ naḥsibu	نِحْسِب niḥsib	نْحَسِب nḥasib			نْحَسِب nḥasib or نِحْسِب niḥsib
"piece of wood"	خَشَبَة ḵašaba	خَشَبَة ḵašaba	خْشِبَة ḵšiba			خْشِبَة ḵšiba or خَشَبَة ḵašaba
"camel"	جَمَل jamal	جَمَل jamal	جِمَل jimal			جِمَل jimal or جَمَل jamal
"like"	مِثْل miṯl or كما kama	زَي zay	مِثْل miṯl or كما kima or زَي zay		مِثْل miṯl or زَي zay	
"he"	هُوَ huwa	هُوَّ huwwa	هو hū or huw or huwah or اهو ihwa	هو hū or huw		

== See also ==
- Modern Standard Arabic
- Modern South Arabian languages

== Bibliography ==
- Il-Hazmy, Alayan (1975). A critical and comparative study of the spoken dialect of the Harb tribe in Saudi Arabia (PDF).
