= Voiced velar plosive =

Consonantal sound represented by ⟨ɡ⟩ in IPA

ɡ
- IPA number: 110

Audio sample
- source · help

Encoding
- Entity (decimal): &#609;
- Unicode (hex): U+0261
- X-SAMPA: g
- Braille: ⠛ (braille pattern dots-1245)
Image

A voiced velar plosive or stop is a type of consonantal sound used in many spoken languages. It is familiar to English-speakers as the "g" sound in "against".

Some languages have a voiced pre-velar plosive, which is articulated slightly more front compared with the place of articulation of the prototypical velar plosive, though not as front as the prototypical palatal plosive; see voiced palatal plosive § Pre-velar.

Conversely, some languages have a voiced post-velar plosive, which is articulated slightly behind the place of articulation of the prototypical velar plosive, though not as back as the prototypical uvular plosive; see voiced uvular plosive § Post-velar.

== IPA symbol ==
The symbol in the International Phonetic Alphabet that represents this sound is ⟨ɡ⟩. The traditional IPA symbol is the so-called single-storey or opentail G ⟨⟩, but the double-storey or looptail G ⟨⟩ is acceptable. The Unicode character U+0067 g LATIN SMALL LETTER G renders as either a single-storey G or a double-storey G depending on font; the character U+0261 ɡ LATIN SMALL LETTER SCRIPT G is always a single-storey G, but it is generally available only in fonts supporting the IPA Extensions Unicode character block.

== Features ==
Sagittal section of a voiced velar plosive

Features of a voiced velar stop:

- Its manner of articulation is occlusive, which means it is produced by obstructing airflow in the vocal tract. Since the consonant is also oral, with no nasal outlet, it is a plosive.
- Its place of articulation is velar, which means it is articulated with the back of the tongue (the dorsum) at the soft palate.
- Its phonation is voiced, which means the vocal cords vibrate during the articulation.
- It is an oral consonant, which means that air is not allowed to escape through the nose.
- It is a median consonant, which means it is produced by directing the airstream down the midline of the tongue, rather than to the sides.
- Its airstream mechanism is pulmonic, which means it is articulated by pushing air only with the intercostal muscles and abdominal muscles, as in most speech sounds.

== Occurrence ==
Of the six stops that would be expected from the most common pattern worldwide—that is, three places of articulation plus voicing ([p b, t d, k ɡ])—[p] and [ɡ] are the most frequently missing, being absent in about 10% of languages that otherwise have this pattern. The lack of a voiceless bilabial stop [p] is an areal feature. Missing [ɡ], (when the language uses voicing to contrast stops) on the other hand, is widely scattered around the world, for example /ɡ/ is not a native phoneme of Belarusian, Dutch, Czech, and Slovak and occurs only in borrowed words in those languages. A few languages, such as Modern Standard Arabic and part of the Levantine dialects (e.g. Lebanese and Syrian), are missing both, although most of the other Arabic dialects have /ɡ/ in their native phonemic systems as a reflex of ⟨ق⟩ or less commonly of ⟨ج⟩.

It seems that [ɡ] is somewhat more difficult to articulate than the other basic stops. Ian Maddieson speculates that this may be due to a physical difficulty in voicing velars: Voicing requires that air flow into the mouth cavity, and the relatively small space allowed by the position of velar consonants means that it will fill up with air quickly, making voicing difficult to maintain in [ɡ] for as long as it is in [d] or [b]. This could have two effects: [ɡ] and [k] might become confused, and the distinction is lost, or perhaps a [ɡ] never develops when a language first starts making voicing distinctions. With uvulars, where there is even less space between the glottis and tongue for airflow, the imbalance is more extreme: voiced [ɢ] is much rarer than voiceless [q].

In many Indo-Aryan languages, such as Hindustani, plain [ɡ] and aspirated [ɡʱ] are in contrastive distribution.

Language		Word	IPA	Meaning	Notes
Abkhaz		ажыга/ažëga	[aˈʐəɡa]	'shovel'	See Abkhaz phonology
Adyghe	Shapsug	гьэгуалъэ/gägwaĺa	[ɡʲaɡʷaːɬa]	'toy'	Dialectal. Corresponds to [d͡ʒ] in other dialects.
Adyghe	Temirgoy	чъыгы/ čëgë	[t͡ʂəɡə]	'tree'	Dialectal. Corresponds to [ɣ] in other dialects.
Albanian		gomar	[ˈɡomaɾ]	'donkey'	
Arabic	Moroccan	أݣادير / ʾagādīr	[ʔaɡaːdiːr]	'Agadir'	
Arabic	Tunisian	ڨفصة / gafṣa	[ɡɑfsˤɑ]	'Gafsa'	See Tunisian arabic phonology
Arabic	Hejazi	قمر / gamar	[ɡamar]	'moon'	Corresponds to [q] in Classical and Modern Standard Arabic.
Arabic	Najdi	قمر / gamar	[ɡəmar]	'moon'	Corresponds to [q] in Classical and Modern Standard Arabic.
Arabic	Sa'idi	قمر / gamar	[ɡɑmɑr]	'moon'	Corresponds to [q] in Classical and Modern Standard Arabic.
Arabic	Yemeni	قال / gāl	[ɡæːl]	'(he) said'	Pronunciation of ⟨ق⟩ in San'ani and Hadhrami dialects
Arabic	Yemeni	جمل / gamal	[ɡæmæl]	'camel'	Pronunciation of ⟨ج⟩ in Ta'izzi-Adeni and Tihami dialects
Arabic	Egyptian	راجل / rāgel	[ˈɾɑːɡel]	'man'	See Egyptian arabic phonology
Armenian	Eastern	գանձ/ganź	[ɡɑndz]	'treasure'	
Assyrian		ܓܢܐ ɡana	[ɡaːna]	'self'	Used predominantly in Urban Koine. Corresponds to [dʒ] in Urmia, some Tyari and Jilu dialects.
Azerbaijani		qara / قارا	[ɡɑɾɑ]	'black'	
Basque		galdu	[ɡaldu]	'lose'	
Bengali		গান/gan	[ɡan]	'song'	Contrasts with aspirated form. See Bengali phonology
Breton		givri	[ɡivʁi]	'goat'	
Bulgarian		гора/gora	[ɡora]	'forest'	See Bulgarian phonology
Catalan		guant	[ˈɡwän̪(t̪)]	'glove'	See Catalan phonology
Chechen		говр/govr	[ɡɔʊ̯r]	'horse'	
Czech		gram	[ɡram]	'gram'	See Czech phonology
Danish	Standard	lykke	[ˈløɡə]	'happiness'	Only partially voiced; possible allophone of /ɡ/ in the intervocalic position. More often voiceless [k]. See Danish phonology
Dutch	All dialects	zakdoek	[ˈzɑɡduk]	'tissue'	Allophone of /k/, occurring only before voiced consonants in native words. See Dutch phonology
Dutch	Many speakers	goal	[ɡoːɫ]	'goal'	Only in loanwords. Some speakers may realize it as [ɣ] ~ [ʝ] ~ [χ] ~ [x] (like a normal Dutch ⟨g⟩), or as [k].
Dutch	Amelands	goëd	[ɡuə̯d]	'good'	
English		gaggle	[ˈɡæɡɫ̩]	'gaggle'	See English phonology
Filipino		gulo	[ɡulɔ]	'commotion'	
French		gain	[ɡɛ̃]	'earnings'	See French phonology
Georgian		გული/guli	[ˈɡuli]	'heart'	
German		Lüge	[ˈlyːɡə]	'lie'	See Standard German phonology
Greek		γκάρισμα / gkárisma	[ˈɡɐɾizmɐ]	'donkey's bray'	See Modern Greek phonology
Gujarati		ગાવું/gávu	[gaːʋʊ̃]	'to sing'	See Gujarati phonology
Hebrew		גב/gav	[ɡav]	'back'	See Modern Hebrew phonology
Hindustani		गाना/gáná / gáná/گانا	[ɡäː.naː]	'song'	Contrasts with aspirated form. See Hindustani phonology
Hungarian		engedély	[ɛŋɡɛdeːj]	'permission'	See Hungarian phonology
Irish		gaineamh	[ˈɡanʲəw]	'sand'	See Irish phonology
Italian		gare	[ˈɡäːre]	'competitions'	[g] is represented by letter G when followed by vowels [a], [o] [u], while when in front of vowels [i], [e] and [ɛ], the pronunciation changes to d͡ʒ, for the phoneme [g] to appear on the vowels [i], [e] and [ɛ], the GH digraph is used.
Japanese		外套 / gaito	[ɡaitoː]	'overcoat'	See Japanese phonology
Kabardian	Baslaney	гьанэ/ gäna	[ɡʲaːna]	'shirt'	Dialectal. Corresponds to [dʒ] in other dialects.
Kagayanen		kalag	[kað̞aɡ]	'spirit'	
Khmer		ហ្គាស / gas	[ɡaːh]	'gas'	See Khmer phonology
Korean		메기 / megi	[meɡi]	'catfish'	See Korean phonology
Limburgish		zegke	[zεɡə]	'say'	Common. Example from the Weert dialect.
Lithuanian		garai	[ɡɐrɐɪ̯ˑ]	'steam'	See Lithuanian phonology
Luxembourgish		agepack	[ˈɑɡəpaːk]	'gone about'	More often voiceless [k]. See Luxembourgish phonology
Macedonian		гром/grom	[ɡrɔm]	'thunder'	See Macedonian phonology
Malay		guni	[ɡuni]	'sack'	
Malayalam		ഗപ്പി/gappi	[ɡɐppi]	'guppy'	See Malayalam phonology
Marathi		गवत/gavat	[ɡəʋət]	'grass'	See Marathi phonology
Nepali		गाउँ	[ɡä̃ũ̯]	'village'	Contrasts with aspirated form. See Nepali phonology
Norwegian		gull	[ɡʉl]	'gold'	See Norwegian phonology
Odia		ଗଛ/gočho	[ɡɔtʃʰɔ]	'tree'	Contrasts with aspirated form.
Persian		گوشت/gušt	[ɡuʃt]	'meat'	
Polish		gmin	[ɡmʲin̪]	'plebs'	See Polish phonology
Portuguese		língua	[ˈɫĩɡwɐ]	'tongue'	See Portuguese phonology
Punjabi		ਗਾਂ/gaa	[ɡɐ̃ː˥˩]	'cow'	
Romanian		gând	[ˈɡɨnd]	'thought'	See Romanian phonology
Russian		голова/golova	[ɡəɫɐˈva]	'head'	See Russian phonology
Serbo-Croatian		гост / gost	[ɡȏ̞ːs̪t̪]	'guest'	See Serbo-Croatian phonology
Slovak		miazga	[ˈmjäzɡä]	'lymph'	See Slovak phonology
Slovene		gost	[ˈɡɔ̂s̪t̪]	'guest'	See Slovene phonology
Somali		gaabi	[ɡaːbi]	'to shorten'	See Somali phonology
Southern Min	Hokkien	我/góa	[ɡua˥˧]	'I'	
Spanish		gato	[ˈɡät̪o̞]	'cat'	See Spanish phonology
Swahili		giza	[ˈɡīzɑ]	'darkness'	See Swahili phonology
Swedish		god	[ɡuːd̪]	'tasty'	May be an approximant in casual speech. See Swedish phonology
Telugu		గచ్చు/gaccu	[ɡat͡sːu]	'Floor'	contrasts with aspirated form (which is articulated as breathy consonant).
Turkish		salgın	[säɫˈɡɯn]	'epidemic'	See Turkish phonology
Ukrainian		ґанок / ganok	[ˈɡɑn̪ok]	'porch'	See Ukrainian phonology
Welsh		gwyn	[ɡwɪn] or [ɡwɨ̞n]	'white'	See Welsh phonology
West Frisian		gasp	[ɡɔsp]	'buckle' (n.)	See West Frisian phonology
Wu	Shanghainese	狂/guaon^{6}	[ɡuɑ̃^{23}]	'crazy'	
Xiang		共/wong	[ɡoŋ]	'together'	
Yi		ꈨ / gge	[ɡɤ˧]	'hear'	
Zapotec	Tilquiapan	gan	[ɡaŋ]	'will be able'	Depending on speaker and carefulness of speech, [ɡ] may be lenited to [ɣ]

== See also ==
- Index of phonetics articles
- Arabic letters specifically to create the phoneme /ɡ/ in loanwords:
  - ج
  - چ
  - غ
  - ق
  - ڨ
  - ك
  - ڭ
  - گ

== Notes ==
Place →	Labial					Coronal										Dorsal					Laryngeal			
Manner ↓	Bilabial		Labiodental		Linguolabial		Dental		Alveolar		Postalveolar		Retroflex		(Alveolo-)palatal		Velar		Uvular		Pharyngeal/epiglottal		Glottal	
Nasal	m̥	m	ɱ̊	ɱ		n̼	n̪̊	n̪	n̥	n	n̠̊	n̠	ɳ̊	ɳ	ɲ̊	ɲ	ŋ̊	ŋ	ɴ̥	ɴ				
Plosive	p	b	p̪	b̪	t̼	d̼	t̪	d̪	t	d			ʈ	ɖ	c	ɟ	k	ɡ	q	ɢ	ʡ		ʔ	
Sibilant affricate							t̪s̪	d̪z̪	ts	dz	t̠ʃ	d̠ʒ	tʂ	dʐ	tɕ	dʑ								
Non-sibilant affricate	pɸ	bβ	p̪f	b̪v			t̪θ	d̪ð	tɹ̝̊	dɹ̝	t̠ɹ̠̊˔	d̠ɹ̠˔			cç	ɟʝ	kx	ɡɣ	qχ	ɢʁ	ʡʜ	ʡʢ	ʔh	
Sibilant fricative							s̪	z̪	s	z	ʃ	ʒ	ʂ	ʐ	ɕ	ʑ								
Non-sibilant fricative	ɸ	β	f	v	θ̼	ð̼	θ	ð	θ̠	ð̠	ɹ̠̊˔	ɹ̠˔	ɻ̊˔	ɻ˔	ç	ʝ	x	ɣ	χ	ʁ	ħ	ʕ	h	ɦ
Approximant		β̞		ʋ				ð̞		ɹ		ɹ̠		ɻ		j		ɰ						˷
Tap/flap		ⱱ̟		ⱱ					ɾ̥	ɾ			ɽ̊	ɽ						ɢ̆		ʡ̆		
Trill	ʙ̥	ʙ							r̥	r		r̠	ɽ̊r̥	ɽr					ʀ̥	ʀ	ʜ	ʢ		
Lateral affricate									tɬ	dɮ			tꞎ	d𝼅	c𝼆	ɟʎ̝	k𝼄	ɡʟ̝						
Lateral fricative							ɬ̪		ɬ	ɮ			ꞎ	𝼅	𝼆	ʎ̝	𝼄	ʟ̝						
Lateral approximant								l̪	l̥	l		l̠	ɭ̊	ɭ	ʎ̥	ʎ	ʟ̥	ʟ		ʟ̠				
Lateral tap/flap									ɺ̥	ɺ			𝼈̊	𝼈		ʎ̆		ʟ̆						

		BL	LD	D	A	PA	RF	P	V	U
Implosive	Voiced	ɓ			ɗ		ᶑ	ʄ	ɠ	ʛ
Implosive	Voiceless	ɓ̥			ɗ̥		ᶑ̊	ʄ̊	ɠ̊	ʛ̥
Ejective	Stop	pʼ			tʼ		ʈʼ	cʼ	kʼ	qʼ
Ejective	Affricate		p̪fʼ	tθʼ	tsʼ	tʃʼ	tʂʼ	tɕʼ	kxʼ	qχʼ
Ejective	Fricative	ɸʼ	fʼ	θʼ	sʼ	ʃʼ	ʂʼ	ɕʼ	xʼ	χʼ
Ejective	Lateral affricate				tɬʼ			c𝼆ʼ	k𝼄ʼ	q𝼄ʼ
Ejective	Lateral fricative				ɬʼ					
Click (top: velar; bottom: uvular)	Tenuis	kʘ qʘ		kǀ qǀ	kǃ qǃ		k𝼊 q𝼊	kǂ qǂ		
Click (top: velar; bottom: uvular)	Voiced	ɡʘ ɢʘ		ɡǀ ɢǀ	ɡǃ ɢǃ		ɡ𝼊 ɢ𝼊	ɡǂ ɢǂ		
Click (top: velar; bottom: uvular)	Nasal	ŋʘ ɴʘ		ŋǀ ɴǀ	ŋǃ ɴǃ		ŋ𝼊 ɴ𝼊	ŋǂ ɴǂ	ʞ	
Click (top: velar; bottom: uvular)	Tenuis lateral				kǁ qǁ					
Click (top: velar; bottom: uvular)	Voiced lateral				ɡǁ ɢǁ					
Click (top: velar; bottom: uvular)	Nasal lateral				ŋǁ ɴǁ					
