= Hadhrami Arabic =

Variety of the Arabic language

- اللهجة الحضرمية
- Native to: Hadhramaut, Yemen
- Ethnicity: Hadharem
- Speakers: 5.1 million (2020)
- Language family: Afro-Asiatic: Semitic; West Semitic; Central Semitic; Arabic; Peninsular; Yemeni; Hadhrami Arabic
- Dialects: Indonesian Arabic
- Writing system: Arabic alphabet

Language codes
- ISO 639-3: ayh
- Glottolog: hadr1236
- Distribution of Hadhrami Arabic according to Ethnologue

Hadhrami Arabic (Arabic: اللهجة الحضرمية, romanized: al-Lahjah al-Ḥaḍramiyah) is a variety of Arabic spoken by the Hadharem living in the region of Hadhramaut in southeastern Yemen. It is also spoken by many emigrants, who migrated from Hadhramaut to the Horn of Africa (Somalia and Eritrea), East Africa (Comoros, Zanzibar, Kenya, Tanzania, and Mozambique), Southeast Asia (Indonesia, Malaysia, Brunei and Singapore) and, recently, to the other Arab states of the Persian Gulf.

Hadhrami Arabic is also the main element language that forms a local variety of Arabic in Indonesia. This variety was eventually referred to as Indonesian Arabic, where most of the vocabulary and grammar are absorbed from here.

== Phonology ==
The dialect in many towns and villages in the Wādī (valley) and the coastal region is characterised by its ج /dʒ/-yodization, changing the Classical Arabic reflex /dʒ/ to the approximant ي [j]. That resembles some Eastern Arabian and Gulf dialects, including the dialects of Basra in Iraq, Kuwait, Qatar, Bahrain other Arab Emirates. In educated speech, ج is realised as a voiced palatal plosive [ɟ] or affricate [dʒ] in some lexical items which are marked [+ religious] or [+ educated] (see ق /q/ below).

The ق /q/ reflex is pronounced as a voiced velar [ɡ] in all lexical items throughout the dialect. In some other Arabic dialects, /q/ is realised as a voiceless uvular plosive [q] in certain marked lexemes [+ religious], [+ educational]: /qurʔaːn/ “Qur’an”. With the spread of literacy and contact with speakers of other Arabic dialects, future sociolinguistic research may reveal whether using the uvular /q/ in certain lexemes and retaining the velar /ɡ/ for others will occur.

=== Consonants ===
		Labial	Interdental		Dental/Alveolar		Palatal	Velar	Uvular	Pharyngeal	Glottal
		Labial	plain	emph.	plain	emph.	Palatal	Velar	Uvular	Pharyngeal	Glottal
Nasal		m			n						
Stop	voiceless				t	tˤ		k	q		ʔ
Stop	voiced	b			d		ɟ ~ d͡ʒ	ɡ			
Fricative	voiceless	f	θ		s	sˤ	ʃ		χ	ħ	h
Fricative	voiced		ð	ðˤ	z				ʁ	ʕ	
Trill					r						
Approximant					l	ɫ	j	w			

- Sounds /t, tˀ/ are phonetically noted as lamino-alveolar stops [t̻, t̻ˤ].
- /d/ is phonetically noted as an apical-alveolar stop [d̺].
- /ɟ/ can be heard as a voiced palatal plosive or an affricate sound /dʒ/.
- In the dialects of Al-Qarn, both /t, tˤ/ and /d/ can be heard as affricated [tʃ, tʃˤ], [dʒ].
- /m/ can be heard as labiodental [ɱ] when preceding /f/.
- /n/ can be heard as a palatal nasal [ɲ] when following /ɟ ~ dʒ/. When preceding /k, q/, it is then heard as [ŋ, ɴ].

=== Vowels ===
	Front	Back
Close	i iː	u uː
Mid	eː	oː
Open	a aː	

- There are five diphthongs noted as /aj, aw, uj, uːj, eːw/.

In non-emphatic environments, /aː/ is realised as an open front (slightly raised) unrounded [æ]. Thus, /θaːniː/ "second," which is normally realised with an [ɑː]-like quality in the Gulf dialects, is realised with an [æː].

Phoneme	Allophone	Notes
/i/	[ɪ]	in shortened, non-emphatic environments
/i/	[ɨ]	in emphatic or emphatic-like environments
/i/	[e̝]	within the positions of pharyngeal fricatives
/a/	[æ]	in non-emphatic environments
/a/	[ʌ]	in emphatic-like environments
/a/	[ɑ]	within the positions of emphatic consonants
/u/	[ə]	in shortened, non-emphatic environments
/u/	[ʊ]	in shortened, non-emphatic environments
/u/	[ʉ]	within the positions of labial or high articulated consonants
/u/	[o]	within the positions of uvular or pharyngeal consonants
/iː/	[iː]	elsewhere in non-emphatic environments
/iː/	[iːᵊ]	diphthongization occurs when in emphatic environments
/eː/	[ɛ̝ː]	elsewhere in non-emphatic environments
/eː/	[ɛː], [ɛːᵊ]	within the positions of emphatic environments
/aː/	[æː]	elsewhere in non-emphatic environments
/aː/	[ɑː]	within the positions of emphatic environments
/oː/	[oː]	elsewhere in non-emphatic environments
/oː/	[ɔː]	elsewhere in non-emphatic environments
/oː/	[ɔːᵊ]	within the positions of emphatic environments
/uː/	[uː]	elsewhere in non-emphatic environments
/uː/	[uːʷ]	within the positions of emphatic environments

Diphthongs
Phoneme	Allophone
/aj/	[æ̆ɪ]
/aj/	[ʌ̆ɪ]
/aw/	[ăʊ]
/aw/	[ʌ̆ʊ]
/uj/	[ɵ̆ɪ]
/uːj/	[uːɪ]
/eːw/	[eːʊ]

Distinctions ث, ت /t/, /θ/ and ذ, د /d/, /ð/ are made in Wādī, but ض /dˤ/ and ظ /ðˤ/ are both pronounced ظ [ðˤ]. The Coast merges all the pairs into the stops د, ت and ض ([t], [d] and [dˤ]), respectively.

The dialect is characterised by not allowing final consonant clusters to occur in final position. Thus, Classical Arabic /bint/ "girl" is realised as /binit/. In initial positions, there is a difference between the Wādī and the coastal varieties. The coast has initial clusters in /bɣaː/ "he wants," /bsˤal/ "onions" and /briːd/ "mail (n.)," but Wādī realises the second and third words as /basˤal/ and /bariːd/, respectively.

== Morphology ==
When the first person singular comes as an independent subject pronoun, it is marked for gender: /anaː/ for masculine and /aniː/ for feminine. As an object pronoun, it comes as a bound morpheme: /-naː/ for masculine and /-niː/ for feminine. The first person subject plural is naḥnā.

The first person direct object plural is /naħnaː/ rather than the /-naː/ of many dialects. Thus, the cognate of the Classical Arabic /dˤarabanaː/ "he hit us" is /ðˤarab naħnaː/.

Stem VI, tC1āC2aC3, can be umlauted to tC1ēC2aC3, thus changing the pattern vowel ā to ē. That leads to a semantic change, as in /tʃaːradaw/ "they ran away suddenly" and /tʃeːradaw/ "they shirk, try to escape."

Intensive and frequentative verbs are common in the dialect. Thus /kasar/ "to break" is intensified to /kawsar/, as in /koːsar fi l-lʕib/ "he played rough." It can be metathesized to become frequentative, as in /kaswar min iðˤ-ðˤaħkaːt/ "he made a series (lit. breaks) of giggles or laughs."

== Syntax ==
The syntax has many similarities to other Peninsular Arabic dialects. However, the dialect contains a number of unique particles used for co-ordination, negation, and other sentence types. Examples in coordination include /kann, laːkan/ "but, nevertheless, though," /maː/ (Classical Arabic /ammaː/) "as for…," and /walla/ "or."

Like many other dialects, apophonic or ablaut passive (as in /kutib/ "it was written") is not very common, and is mainly confined to clichés and proverbs from other dialects, including Classical Arabic.

The particle /qad/ developed semantically in the dialect to /kuð/ or /ɡuð/ "yet, already, almost, nearly" and /ɡad/ or /ɡid/ "maybe, perhaps."

== Vocabulary ==
There are a few lexical items that are shared with Modern South Arabian languages, which perhaps distinguish this dialect from other neighbouring Peninsular dialects. The effect of Hadhrami emigration to Southeast Asia (see Arab Indonesians and Arab Singaporeans), the Indian subcontinent and East Africa is clear in the vocabulary especially in certain registers like types of food and dress: /sˤaːruːn/ "sarong." Many loanwords are listed in al-Saqqaf (2006).

== See also ==
- Varieties of Arabic
- Peninsular Arabic
- Indonesian Arabic
