= Phenebythis =

Phenebythis (Φενέβυθις, also Φενέβηθις) was a village in the nomos of Panopolis in Roman Egypt. It is attested in documentary papyri from at least the late 3rd century CE. In 298 CE, a papyrus from Panopolis refers to it as a κώμη, kōmē, or village.

Phenebythis was also the name of one of the toparchies of the Panopolite nomos. It was one of the localities on the western bank of the Nile and belonged to the same toparchy as Bompae. Its precise identification is uncertain, although an identification with the area of modern Sohag has been proposed as plausible.

The 5th-century Egyptian grammarian Horapollo is described as being originally from Phenebythis in the Panopolite nomos. A petition attributed to Horapollo also mentions his house at Phenebythis.

== Bibliography ==
- El-Sayed, Ragab; El-Masry, Mohamed. Athribis I.
- Quaegebeur, Jan. "Mummy Labels, An Orientation." Papyrologica Lugduno-Batava 19 (1978): 251.
