= Painted enigma =

Originally used by Jesuits as a learning aid for students, painted enigmas are visual riddles - generally speaking, a picture with an easily understood superficial subject that contains a hidden meaning, usually one word. This differed from similar visual riddles such as the emblem or hieroglyph (Horapollo's "Hieroglyphica" for instance)which were simpler in design and intended to represent moral precepts. The emblem and painted enigma were similar in that each usually contained some clue that the composition contained a hidden meaning, usually a "written legend which might be a verbal riddle or rebus to be solved by the same word, or a simple epigrammatic motto such as constituted the 'soul' of the emblem." First developed at the Jesuit college Pont a Mousson in 1588, it developed into an erudite courtly entertainment by the seventeenth century.

The earliest verifiable painted enigmas from this era were painted by Charles Le Brun.
