= X/1882 K1 (Tewfik) =

Kreutz sungrazer comet that appeared during the May 1882 solar eclipse

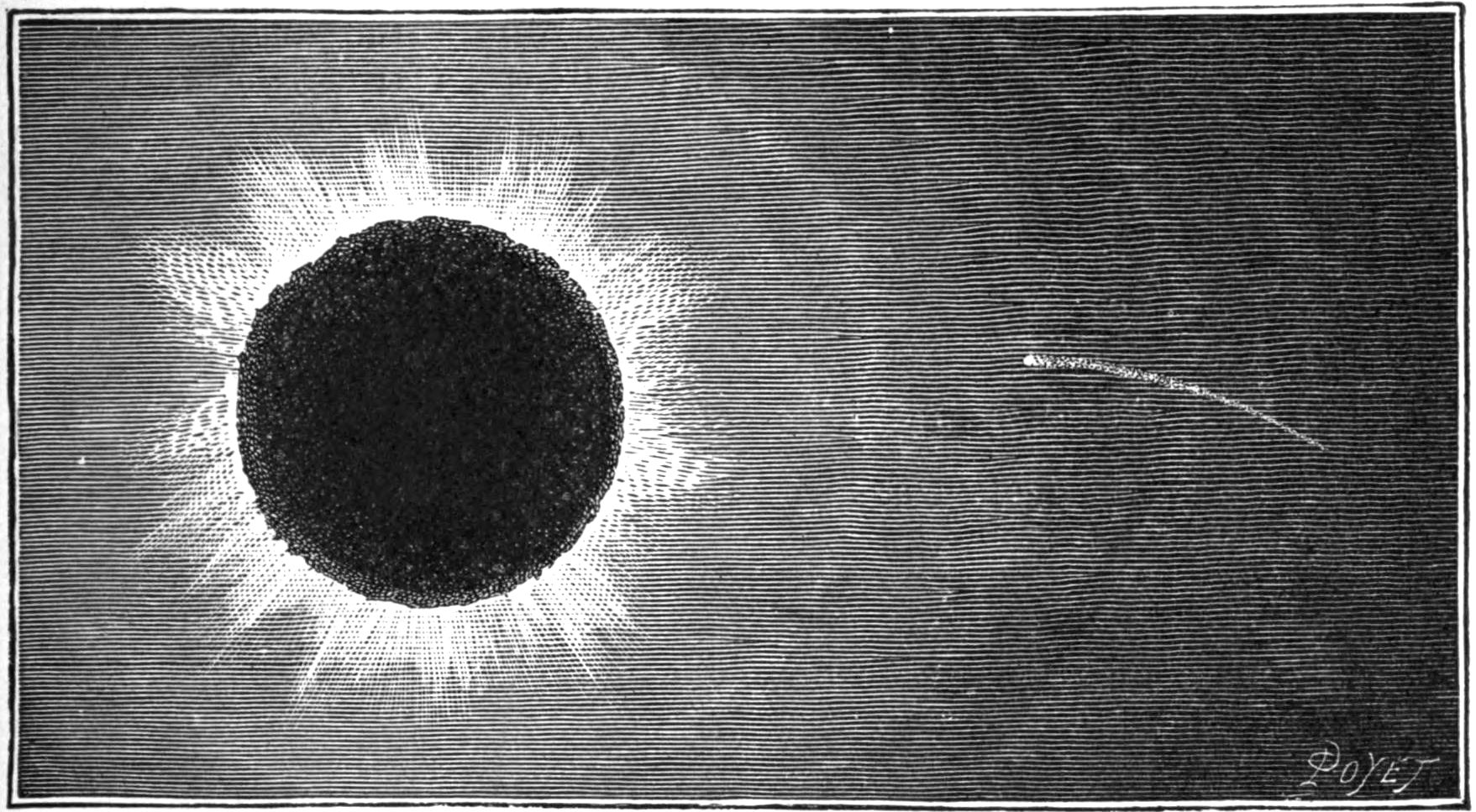
- Drawing of Comet Tewfik by George F. Chambers

Discovery
- Discovered by: Arthur Schuster; M. Trépied
- Discovery site: Sohag, Egypt
- Discovery date: 17 May 1882

Designations
- Alternative designations: Eclipse Comet of 1882; KM1882-3

Orbital characteristics
- Observation arc: 70 sec (0.001 day)
- Number of observations: 1
- Orbit type: Kreutz sungrazer
- Perihelion: 0.00534 AU
- Eccentricity: ~1.000
- Max. orbital speed: 500 km/s
- Inclination: 144.50°
- Longitude of ascending node: 7.69°
- Argument of periapsis: 86.16°
- Last perihelion: 17 May 1882

Physical characteristics
- Apparent magnitude: 0.0 (1882 apparition)

The Eclipse Comet of 1882, designated as X/1882 K1, was a Kreutz sungrazer comet that was spotted during the solar eclipse of 17 May 1882. It is sometimes referred to as Comet Tewfik, named after the Khedive of Egypt at the time, Tewfik Pasha.

== Discovery and observations ==
A party of observers gathered in Upper Egypt to watch a total solar eclipse that occurred on 17 May 1882. By coincidence, a comet was spotted moving across the sky during the 70-second long eclipse. Observers noted a "luminous streak" about magnitude 0.0 in brightness, and only half a degree from the limb of the Sun. It was not identified as a comet until one of the astronomers, M. Trépied, noticed it in one of Dr. Arthur Schuster's photographs about an hour after the eclipse. Later that night, at a joint meeting held by all astronomers present in the eclipse viewing in Egypt, they all decided to name the comet after Tewfik Pasha, in recognition for the Khedive's hospitality during the event.

Initial investigations suggested that this comet was probably C/1882 F1 (Wells), however later calculations showed that this comet would not have been in the proper position at the time and it would have been fainter. Comet Tewfik's orbit cannot be determined with great accuracy due to its sighting during the eclipse being the only observation made for it. Despite this, Brian Marsden determined that Comet Tewfik is a member of the Kreutz sungrazer group.

== See also ==
- C/1882 F1 (Wells)
- C/1882 R1, a Kreutz sungrazer that later became the Great Comet of 1882, four months after Tewfik.
