= Hazz al-quhuf =

Hazz al-quħūf, also known by its full title Hazz al-quħūf bi šarħ qaṣīd ʾabī šadūf (Brains Confounded by the Ode of Abu Shaduf Expounded), is a humorous 17th-century Arabic literary text written by Yusuf ibn Muhammad ibn 'Abd al-Jawad ibn Khidr al-Shirbini. The main subject of the book is everyday Egyptian rural life. It is known to contain some of the best samples of colloquial Arabic to have survived from before the 19th-century and is considered unusual in pre-20th-century literature for its focus on rural rather than urban themes.

== Author ==
Most of what is known of the author, Yusuf al-Shirbini, comes from his own writing in Hazz al-quhuf and another short work, the only 2 surviving texts he authored; he does not appear in any of the biographies of his time.

Yusuf al-Shirbini was born in the first half of the 17th century in Shirbin, a small village in North East Gharbiyya province on the Damietta branch of the Nile in Egypt. He was well-versed in the Arabic science and literature of his day and claimed to have been inspired by Ibn Sudun, the 15th-century Cairene author of Nuzhat al-nufus wa mudhik al-'abus (The Entertainment of Souls and Bringing a Smile to a Scowling Face). Scholars suggest that al-Shirbini was part of an educated urban middle class of ulama (Arabic: علماء ʿulamāʾ, "scholars") who moved from the countryside to the city during this period.

== Themes ==
Hazz al-quhuf is composed in the style of a literary commentary on a 42-line poem purported to be written by a peasant (Arabic: فلاح, fallāḥ) named Abu Shaduf. In his commentary, al-Shirbini describes different customs of peasants and urban dwellers, and notes regional distinctions between the Sa'idi people of Upper Egypt, people of the Nile Delta in Lower Egypt, and the poorest villages scattered in between. Scholars have interpreted some of the text as a parody of the iltizam (Arabic: التزام) system of taxation from this period in Ottoman history, when the Ottoman state gave up central control over rural taxes. Al-Shirbini deals humorously with peasants, country judges, local tax collectors, and sufis. The focus on ordinary 17th Egyptian peasant life makes this work an anomaly for literature of the period.

The text contains about 6750 words of colloquial Egyptian Arabic prose, and the rest is written in a style that is closer to everyday standard Arabic than Literary Arabic. Al-Shirbini makes extensive use of oral material including jokes, recipes, and popular proverbs. It has been regarded as an example of the contradictions of the intellectual world during this period.

== Publication ==
Hazz al-quhuf was completed in March of 1686. There are 10 known surviving manuscripts, some of them only partial texts. Hazz al-quhuf was first printed commercially in 1858 at the Egyptian government press in Bulaq, and since then a number of other editions have been published. In 2005, Humphrey Davies published an edition based on a comparison of several manuscripts, which is considered the most accurate and complete edition.
