= Sohag =

Sohag سوهاج
- City
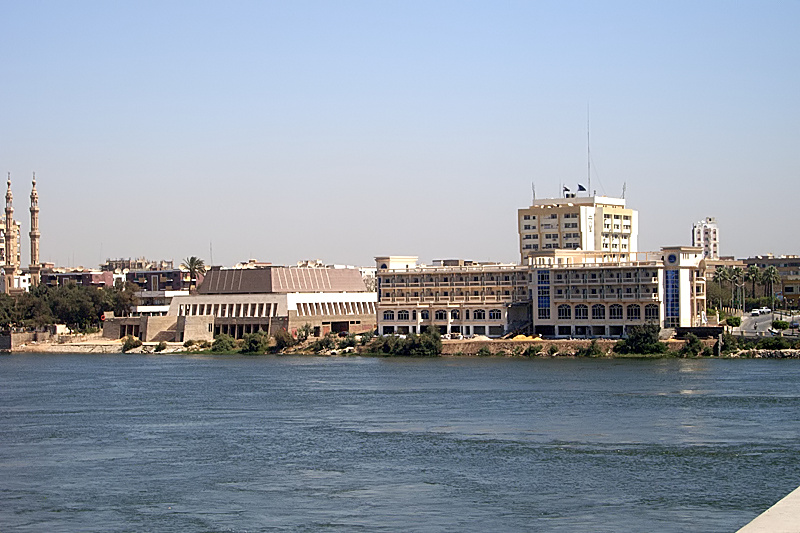
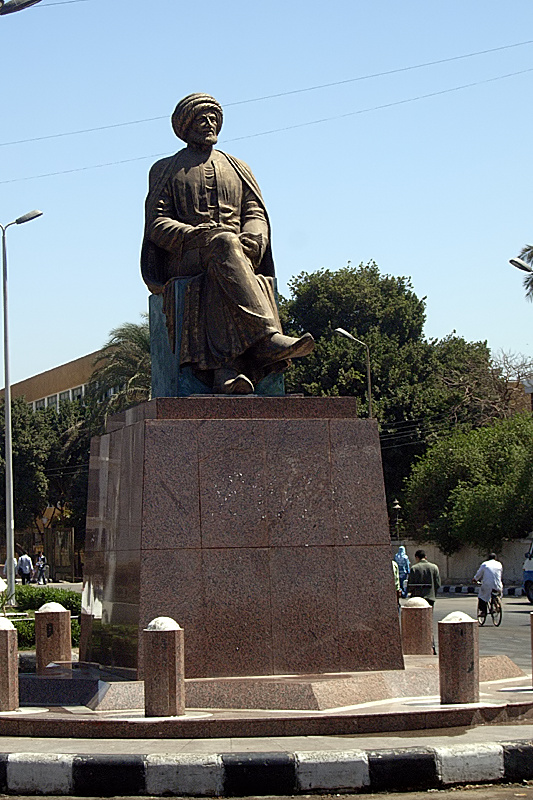
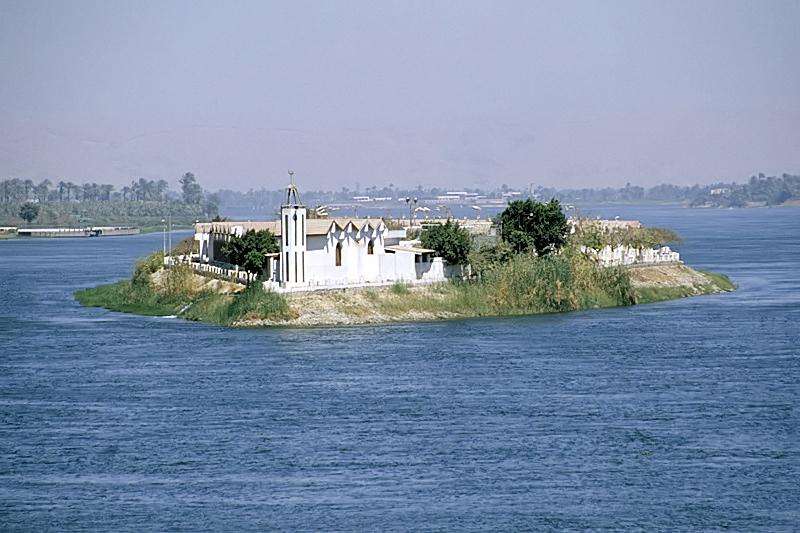
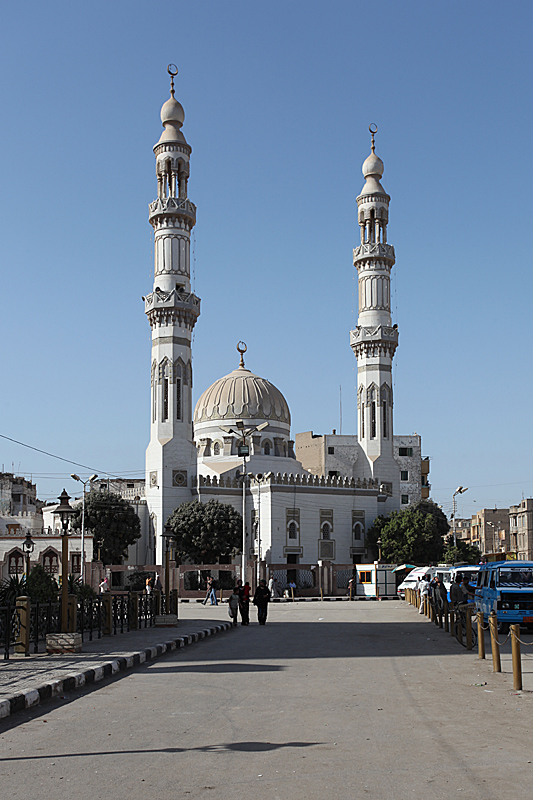
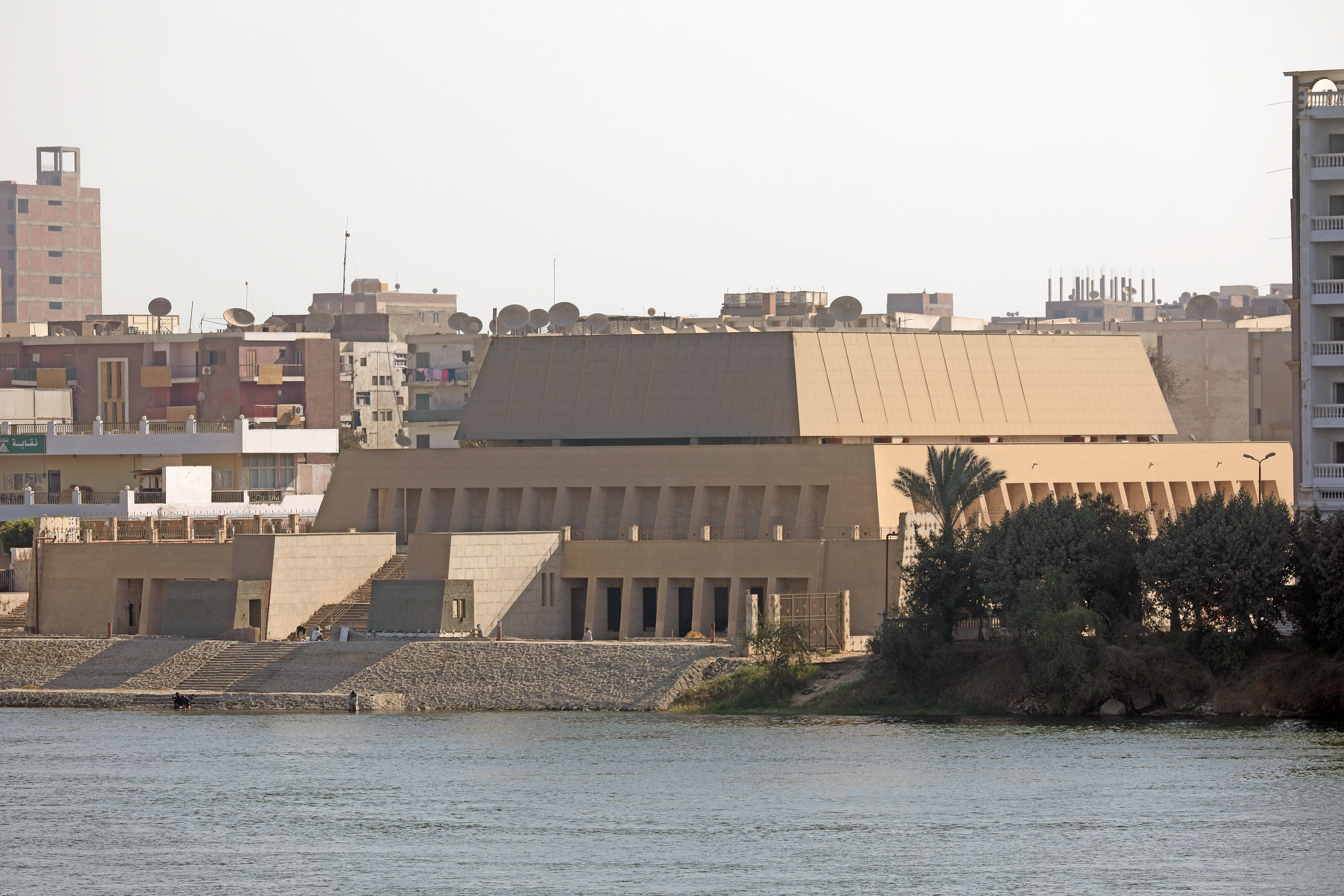
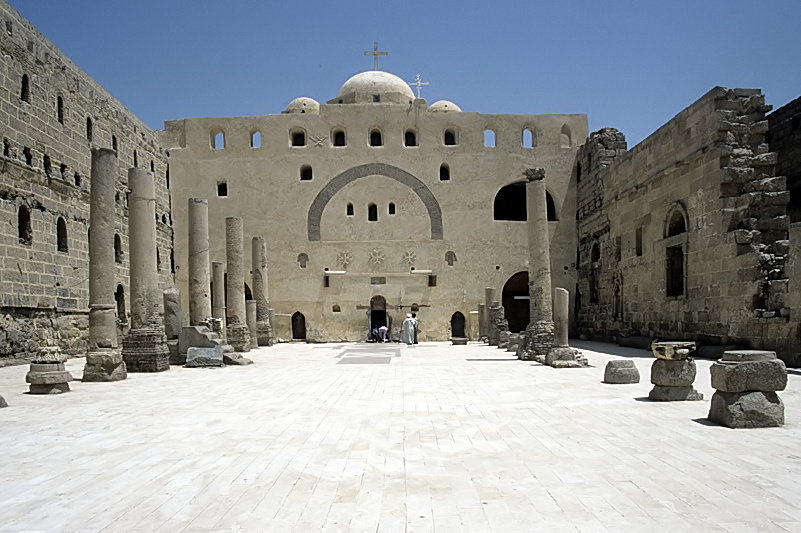
- Nile Corniche Rifa'a at-Tahtawi Square Zohour Island Sidi Arif Mosque Sohag National Museum White Monastery
- Nickname: Bride of the Nile
- Location in Egypt
- Coordinates: 26°33′27.19″N 31°41′48.799″E
- Country: Egypt
- Governorate: Sohag
- Markaz: Sohag Markaz

Government
  - Governor: Dr/Tarik al-Faki

Area
  - Land: 9.03 km^{2} (3.49 sq mi)
- Elevation: 67 m (220 ft)

Population (2021)
  - City: 266,944
  - Rank: 21st in Egypt
  - Density: 29,500/km^{2} (76,500/sq mi)
  - Metro: 600,000
- Demonym(s): Sohagi, Sohagy
- Time zone: UTC+2 (EGY)
  - Summer (DST): UTC+3 (EET)
- Postal code: 82749
- Area code: +20 93
- Website: www.sohag.gov.eg (in Arabic)

Sohag (Arabic: سوهاج, romanized: Sawhāj, Egyptian Arabic pronunciation: [soˈhæːɡ], Sa'idi Arabic pronunciation: [suːˈhaːdʒ]), also spelled as Suhag or Suhaj, is a city on the west bank of the Nile in Egypt. It has been the capital of Sohag Governorate since 1960, before which the capital was Girga and the name of the governorate was Girga Governorate. It also included Esna Governorate (nowadays Qena Governorate).

== History ==
The modern city developed from the village of Suhay (Arabic: السوهاى) (or Sumay), the name of which eventually transformed into Suhaj, and is located on the site of several ancient settlements, the largest of which is Bompae (Ancient Greek: Βομπαή; Coptic: ⲃⲟⲙⲡⲁϩⲟ, lit. 'channel of Paho' or Coptic: ⲡⲓⲃⲟⲙⲡⲁϩⲉ, lit. 'the place of Paha'). The others include Tmupaie (Ancient Greek: Τμουπαει, Coptic: ⲧⲙⲟⲩⲡⲁϩⲟ, lit. 'the island of Paha'), Bay (Arabic: الباى, possibly an Arabisation of the aforementioned "Paha") and Sawaqi (Arabic: سواقى).

== Geography ==
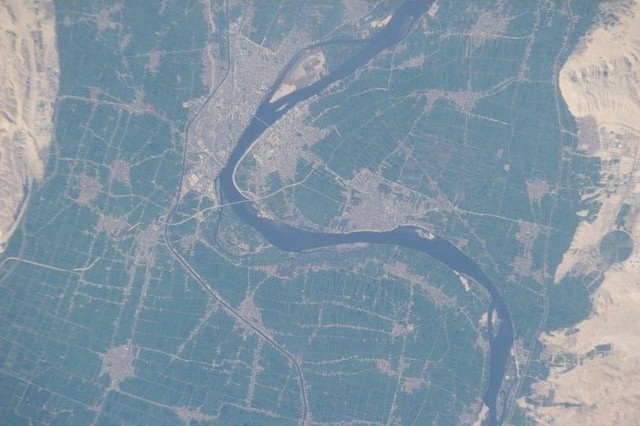
Satellite image of Sohag

Sohag lies on a fertile agricultural plain on the western bank of the Nile, approximately 6 kilometres (3.7 miles) southwest of Akhmim. The city includes two islands; Karaman-ez-Zahur Island is larger and uninhabited, and ez-Zahur Island (جزيرة الزهور, Ǧazīrat az-Zuhur, "Flower Island") has some homes.

== Economy ==
The city of Sohag itself encloses only a few archaeological sites, hence tourism represents only a small portion of the city's income. Other sources of income include trade, small industries of carpets, furniture, spinning and weaving and sugar. Administrative and educational services are two big sectors of income.

== Demographics ==
1928	1976	1986	1996	2006	2012	2018	2021
20,760	101,758	132,965	170,125	189,695	201,339	248,174	266,944
Starting in 1928: Population of Sohag City

=== Religion ===
Islam and Christianity are the main religions in Sohag; about 75% of the population are Muslim.

== Historical sites ==
=== Mosques ===
- Sidi Arif Mosque (Arabic: مسجد العارف بالله, Masjid al-ʿArif bi-Allah). The mosque is located in the south of the city. The el-ʿArif Mosque was built in the 14th century—the 8th century in the Islamic calendar. The present building was constructed around 1995. At the corners of the façade are two minarets and the roof is crowned by a dome. Inside the five-nave mosque the bases of the piers and the walls were lined with red granite. The ceiling is painted ornamentally; in its middle is an elongated light dome. The southeastern half is lit by chandeliers. At the end are the prayer niche (mihrab) with simple ornaments and to the right of it the wooden pulpit (minbar).

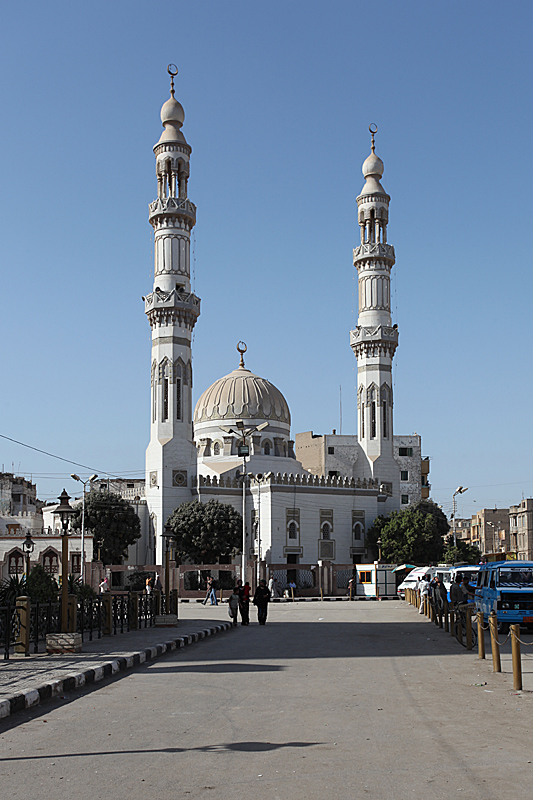
South side of the Sidi Arif Mosque

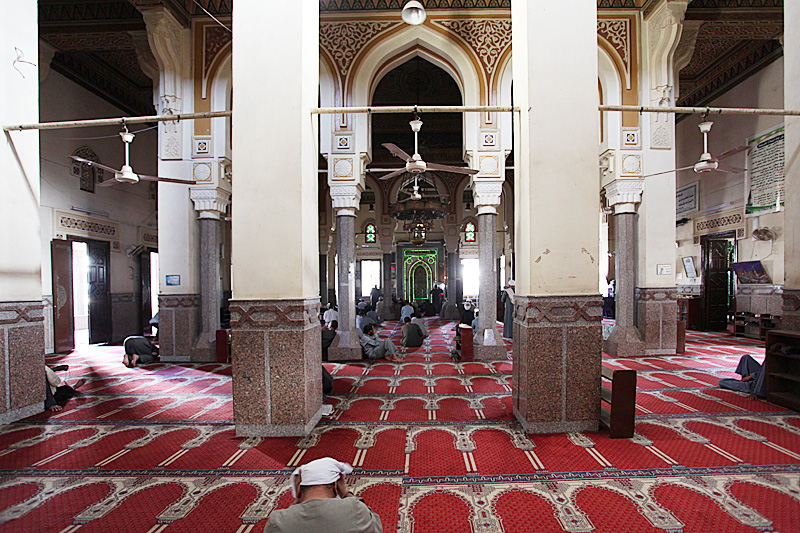
Inside the Sidi Arif Mosque

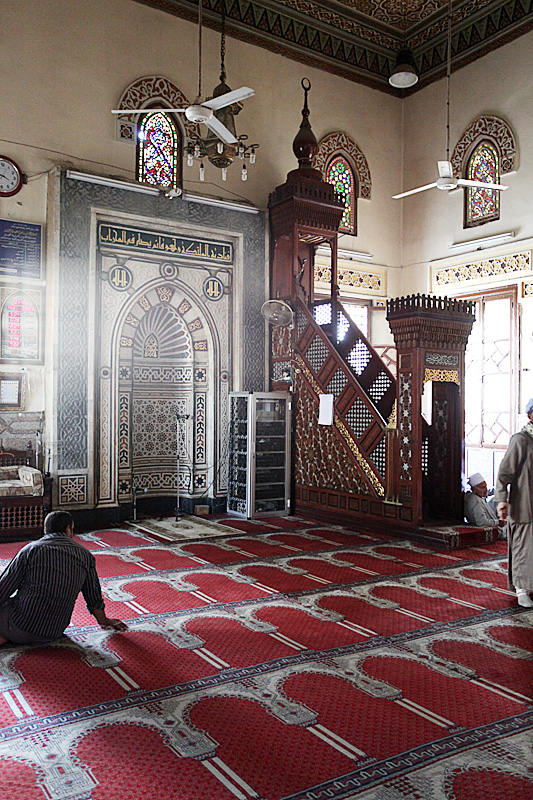
Mihrab and minbar of the Sidi Arif Mosque

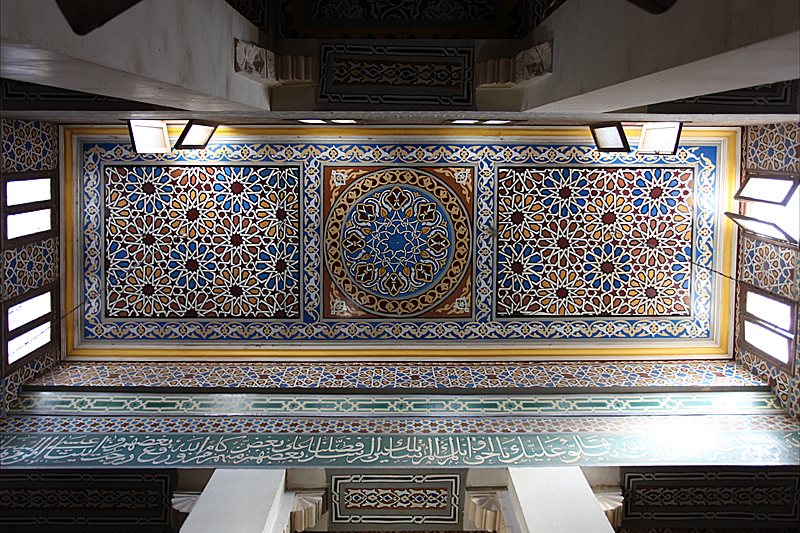
Ceiling of the Sidi Arif Mosque

- El-Farshuti Mosque (Arabic: جامع الفرشوطي, Jāmʿi al-Farschūṭī), also named el-'Atiq Mosque (the old mosque) is located approximately 350 metres (1,150 feet) southwest of the Sidi Arif Mosque. The most striking feature of the mosque is its 53-metre-high (174-foot) minaret in the southeast corner. The minaret has galleries with balustrades on four floors. The mosque is a modern, bright building. The mosque is divided into five naves by columns and pillars. It has a central light dome, which is inscribed at the bottom with a sura from the Qur'an. The bases of the walls are painted yellow and white with green bands. A very colorful prayer niche next to the wooden pulpit is located at the southeastern side.

In the masonry on the eastern, southern and western sides are stones engraved with historical inscriptions moved from previous buildings, including a decree of the penultimate Mamluk sultan al-Ghawri (1441–1516) from the year 1506 (911 AH) on the southeastern side.

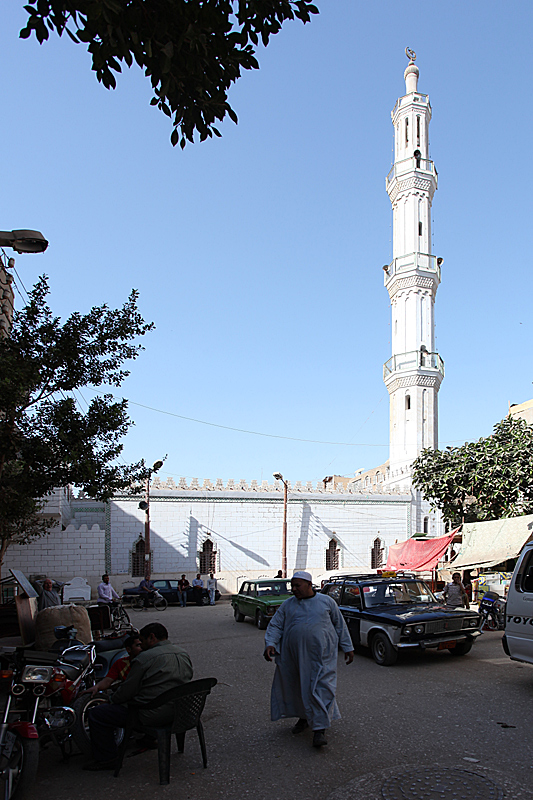
South side of the el-Farshuti Mosque

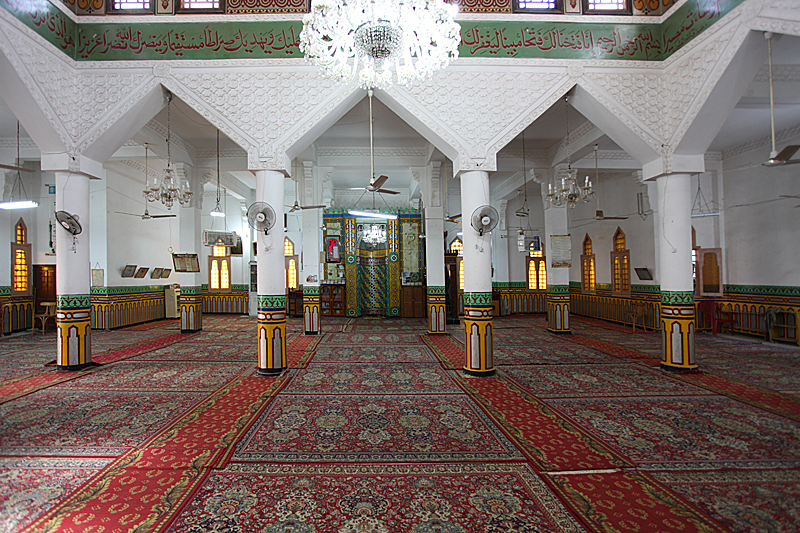
Inside the el-Farshuti Mosque

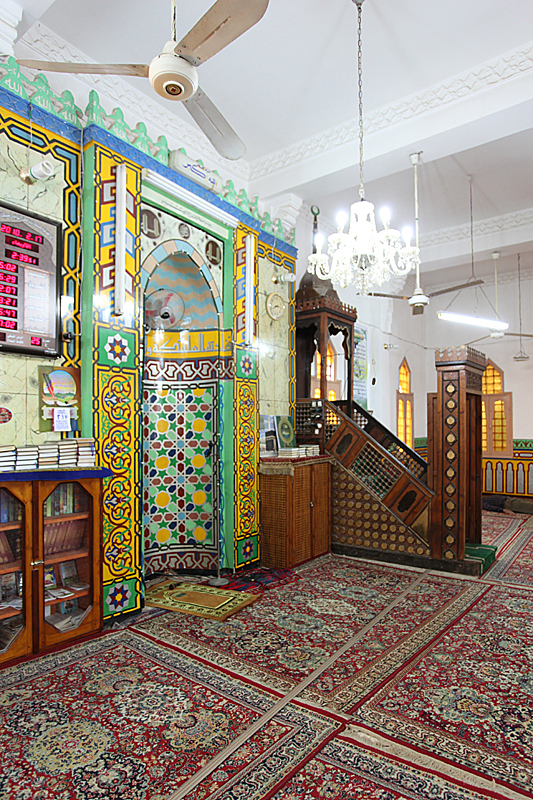
Mihrab and minbar of the el-Farshuti Mosque

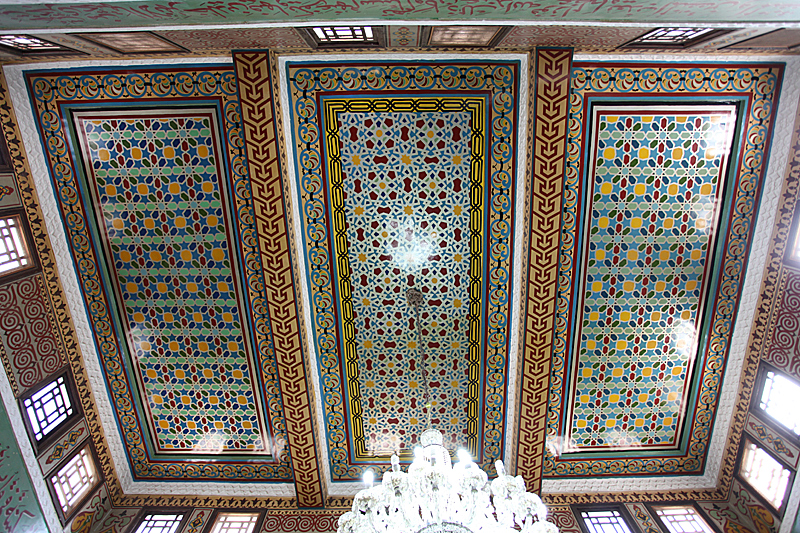
Ceiling of the el-Farshuti Mosque

=== Churches ===
Sohag has two important churches that were erected in the 20th century: the Church of the Holy Virgin and the Church of Saint George.

- The Church of the Holy Virgin (Arabic: كنيسة السيدة العذراء, Kanīsat as-Saiyida al-ʿAdraʾ). The church is located in the north of the bazaar (souq Qaiṣarīya). It consists of five naves. There are three sanctuaries for Saint George (left), the Holy Virgin and the Archangel Michael at the ends of the middle three naves. All sanctuaries are completely screened by a wooden iconostasis. On both sides of the entrances to the sanctuaries are wooden icons of the Holy Virgin and Jesus. The Lord's Last Supper and the crosses are located above the iconstasis. The presentation in the central nave is framed by a fish and a pigeon; the other ones are framed by angels and a dove. Galleries are located above the aisles and the entrance. On the walls are paintings of saints and scenes from the life of Jesus.

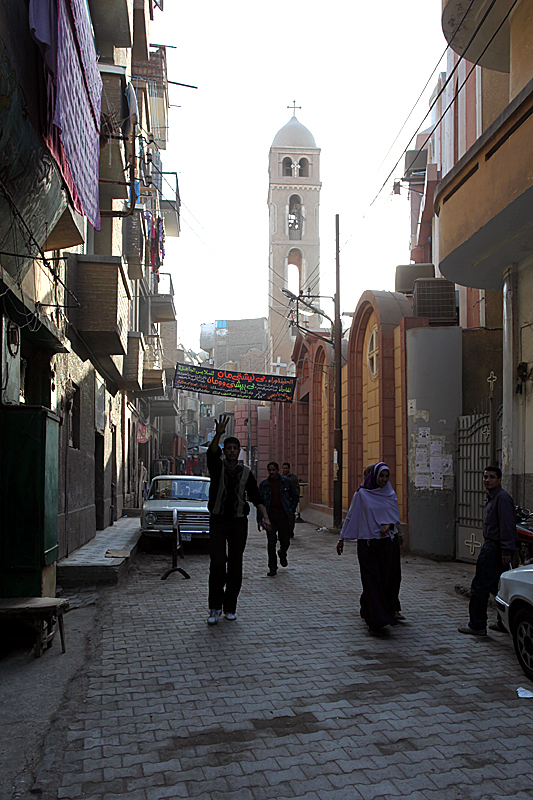
Church of the Holy Virgin

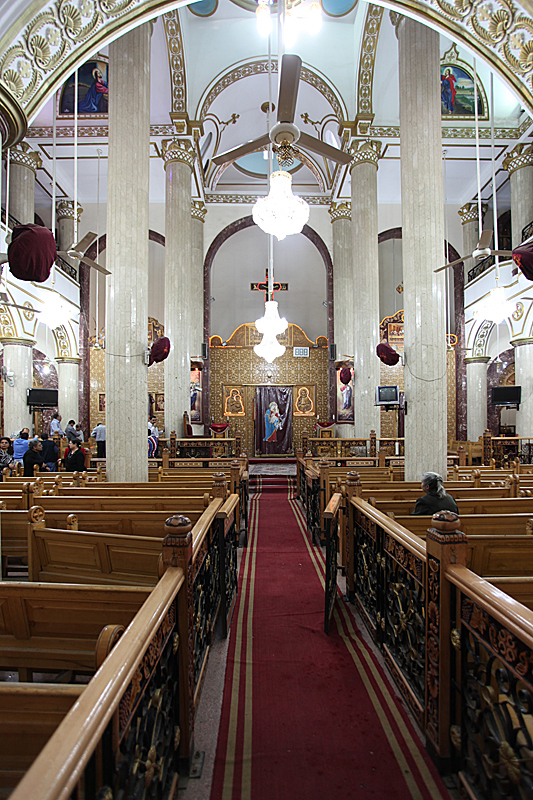
Inside the Church of the Holy Virgin

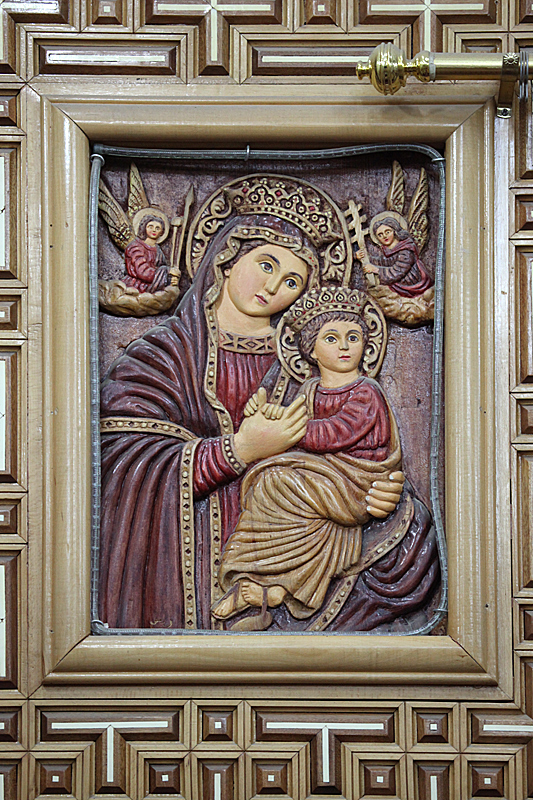
Icon of the Holy Virgin with her child

- Church of St. George is the cathedral of the diocese of Sohag (Arabic: كنيسة مار جرجس, Kanīsat Mar Girgis). The church is located 300 metres (980 feet) north of the Opera (Midan Obira) or Culture Square (Midan eth-Thaqafa).
- Church of the Archangel Michael (Arabic: كنيسة الملاك ميخائيل). The church is located in Railway Station Street (El-Mahatta Street) on the eastern side of the railway tracks.

=== Monasteries ===
==== White Monastery ====
The Coptic White Monastery is a Coptic Orthodox monastery named after Saint Shenouda the Archimandrite. It is located about 5 kilometres (3.1 miles) west of Sohag. The monastery's name is derived from the color of the white limestone in its outside walls. The surviving building is the church of what was once a much larger monastery complex.

==== Red Monastery ====
The Red Monastery is a Coptic Orthodox monastery named after an Egyptian saint called Pishay. It is located about 5 kilometres (3.1 miles) north of the White Monastery. The monastery's name is derived from the color of the construction material of its outside walls, consisting of red (burnt) brick. The walls are considerably thicker at the base than at the top and, like the walls of Ancient Egyptian temples, they are surmounted by cavetto moldings. The Red Monastery is architecturally similar to the White Monastery.

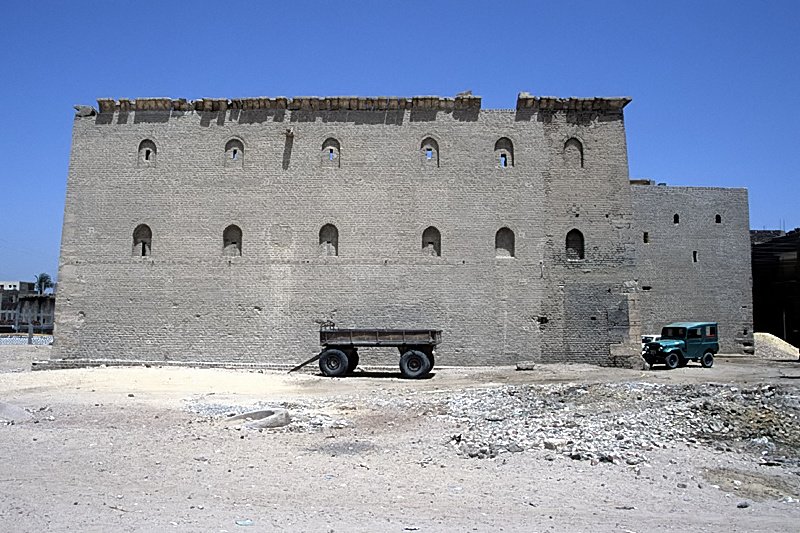
Red Monastery

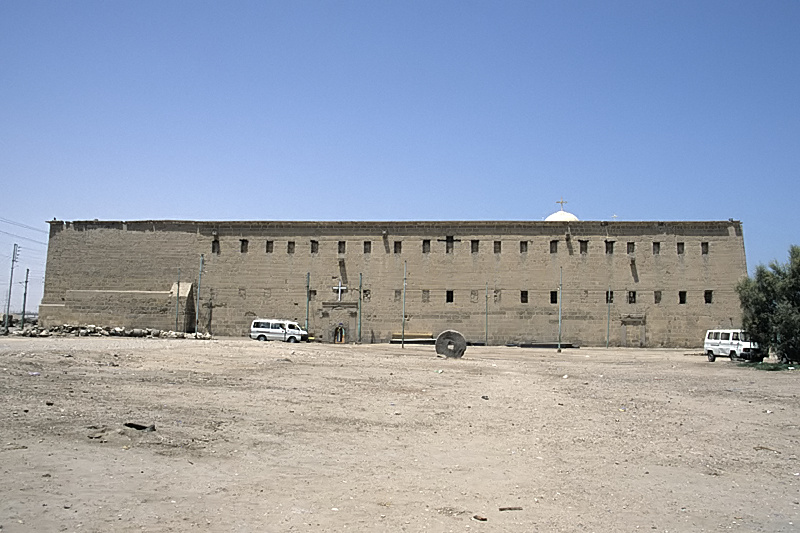
White Monastery

=== Temples and cemeteries ===
Sohag is the site of a temple built for the goddess Repyt (Triphis) by Ptolemy XV Caesarion and subsequent Roman emperors. South of this temple was an earlier temple of Ptolemy IX Soter II (see also Athribis Project). One of the nearby tombs of the brothers Ibpemeny "the younger" and Pemehyt of the late second century BC, has two zodiacs on its ceiling.

== Subdivisions ==
Sohag is informally divided into the East District (Arabic: حى شرق) and the West District (Arabic: حي غرب). Among the most notable regions of the West District are:

- Sidi Aref
- Al Shahid (Arabic for the Martyr)
- Gharb Al-Koubry ("West of the Bridge" neighborhood)

The East District is considered a more upscale district; it includes some of the most affluent neighborhoods of the city including 15th Street, Al Kashef Street, Jumhuriya Street, The Courts Compound, and The Technical and Agricultural Schools. Some of the most notable locales of the East District include:

- The Courts Compound of Sohag
- City Hall of Sohag
- Sohag University
- Sohag Teaching Hospital, one of the biggest hospitals of the region
- Multiple governmental directorates
- Many recreational areas including The Sohag Stadium and many parks including Al Zohour, a revitalized island park located in the middle of the Nile.
- Nasr City, the first satellite city to be built in the East District. It was established during the presidency of Gamal Abdel Nasser.

== Climate ==
The Köppen-Geiger climate classification system classifies Sohag's climate as hot desert (BWh). Luxor, Minya, Sohag, Qena and Asyut have the widest difference of temperatures between days and nights of any city in Egypt, with almost 16 °C (29 °F) difference. Sohag is one of the warmest places in Egypt due to its location on the eastern side of Sahara in North Africa. Sohag is ranked the 5th driest place in Egypt and the 9th globally. Also ranked 4th warmest place in Egypt and 296th globally.

Climate data for Sohag
Month	Jan	Feb	Mar	Apr	May	Jun	Jul	Aug	Sep	Oct	Nov	Dec	Year
Record high °C (°F)	30.8 (87.4)	37.5 (99.5)	42.2 (108.0)	43.9 (111.0)	47.4 (117.3)	47.9 (118.2)	47.0 (116.6)	43.4 (110.1)	44.4 (111.9)	43.1 (109.6)	37.0 (98.6)	33.3 (91.9)	47.9 (118.2)
Mean daily maximum °C (°F)	22.0 (71.6)	23.8 (74.8)	27.5 (81.5)	33.6 (92.5)	37.7 (99.9)	39.6 (103.3)	38.8 (101.8)	37.8 (100.0)	36.0 (96.8)	33.7 (92.7)	28.2 (82.8)	23.5 (74.3)	31.9 (89.4)
Daily mean °C (°F)	13.9 (57.0)	15.6 (60.1)	18.9 (66.0)	24.5 (76.1)	29.1 (84.4)	30.7 (87.3)	31.0 (87.8)	29.9 (85.8)	27.9 (82.2)	25.1 (77.2)	19.8 (67.6)	15.4 (59.7)	23.5 (74.3)
Mean daily minimum °C (°F)	7.3 (45.1)	8.8 (47.8)	11.8 (53.2)	16.6 (61.9)	21.1 (70.0)	23.1 (73.6)	24.1 (75.4)	23.1 (73.6)	20.6 (69.1)	17.8 (64.0)	13.0 (55.4)	9.2 (48.6)	16.4 (61.5)
Record low °C (°F)	0.4 (32.7)	2.6 (36.7)	3.3 (37.9)	7.7 (45.9)	11.5 (52.7)	15.7 (60.3)	17.6 (63.7)	18.0 (64.4)	15.9 (60.6)	11.4 (52.5)	4.8 (40.6)	2.6 (36.7)	0.4 (32.7)
Average precipitation mm (inches)	0 (0)	1 (0.0)	0 (0)	0 (0)	0 (0)	0 (0)	0 (0)	0 (0)	0 (0)	0 (0)	0 (0)	0 (0)	1 (0)
Average precipitation days	0.1	0.1	0.2	0.1	0	0	0	0	0	0	0	0.2	0.7
Average relative humidity (%)	57	50	44	36	30	31	37	43	45	44	51	56	43.7
Source 1: NOAA
Source 2: Climate Charts

== Culture ==
=== Language ===
A version of the dialect continuum of Saidi Arabic is spoken by the people of Sohag. Most urbanized people, however, may speak to varying degrees Egyptian Arabic.

=== Museums ===
The Sohag Museum contains about 5,000 artifacts gathered from around the Sohag governorate, including items stretching from the Middle Kingdom to Greco-Roman times.

=== Bazaars ===
Souq el-Qisareya: The bazaar in Sohag is named suq Qaiṣarīya and is partly covered.

Souq el-Itnein is a weekly market held every Monday morning; vegetables, fruits, animals and traditional hand made objects (like baskets, farming axes and bags) are sold there. The weekly market is believed to have originated during the Ancient Egyptian era. The souq is now in the south of the city and is held in the streets and beside the city cemetery.

== Transport ==
Sohag is linked to Giza and northern cities by the road of Asyut Western Desert, Eastern Desert Road and Rural Road, which also connects it to the railways.

In February 2010, a highway linking Sohag to the Red Sea city Hurghada was opened to ease movement between Upper Egypt and the Red Sea coastal region. In May 2010, the Egyptian President Hosni Mubarak inaugurated Sohag International Airport.

City	Distance (km)
Alexandria	692
Port Said	691
Ismaïlia	616
Suez	605
Cairo	471
Aswan	428
Luxor	205
Asyut	98

== Education ==
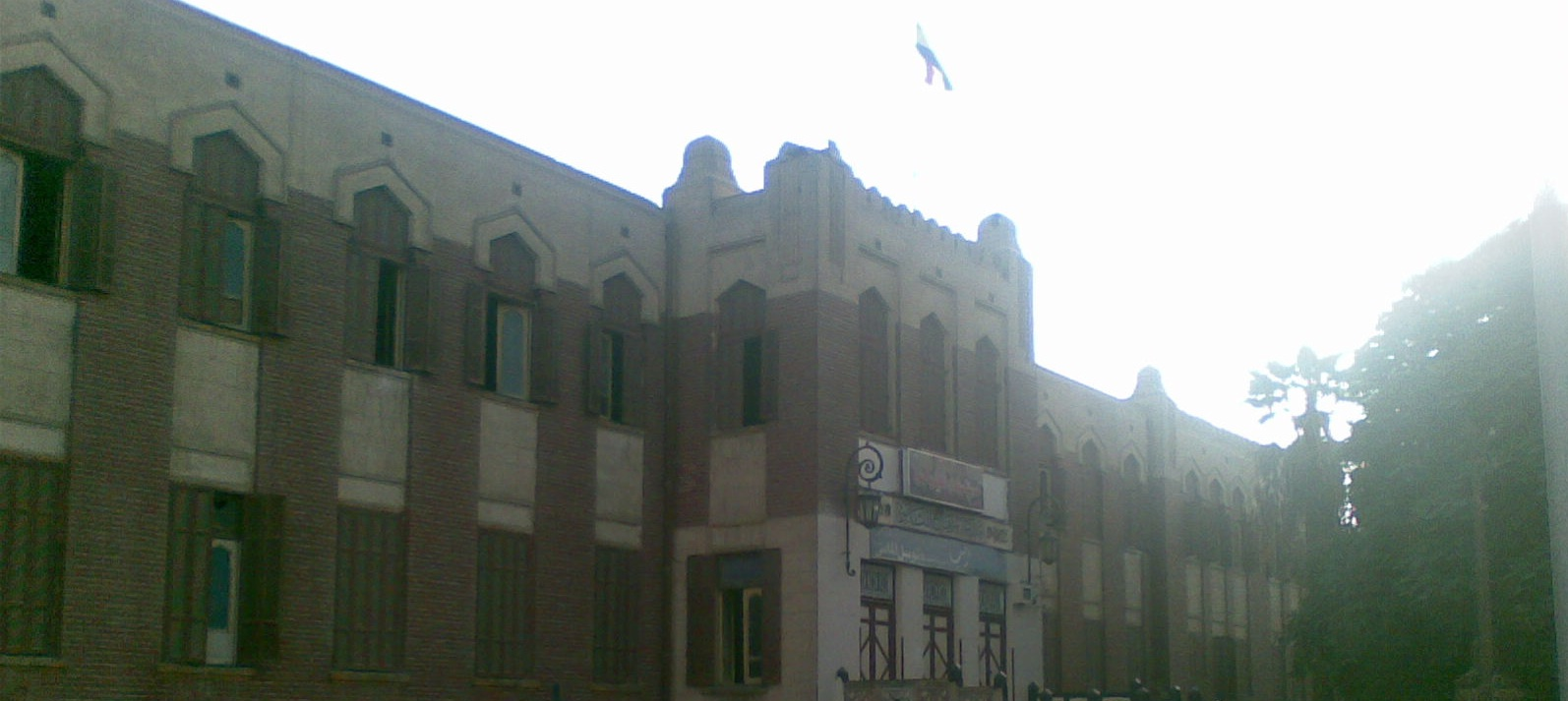
Sohag Military school is one of the oldest schools in Sa'id/Upper Egypt, established in 1928

Educational establishments in Sohag include:

=== Primary schools ===
- Al-Nasr school
- Huda Sharawi school
- Mulhaqat Al-Mu'allemat school

=== Middle schools ===
- Ahmad Deifalla school
- Nabawi Muhandis school
- Ali Osman Baltak school
- Tarik Ibn Ziad school

=== High schools ===
- Sohag Military school
- Abdelmunim Riad school
- Asmaa Bint Abi Bakr school
- Hag Hadad school

=== Universities ===
Sohag University is a public university with more than 40,000 students located on the eastern side of the city. It was established under the banner of South Valley University but became independent in 2006. There are currently ten colleges in Sohag University.

== Sports ==
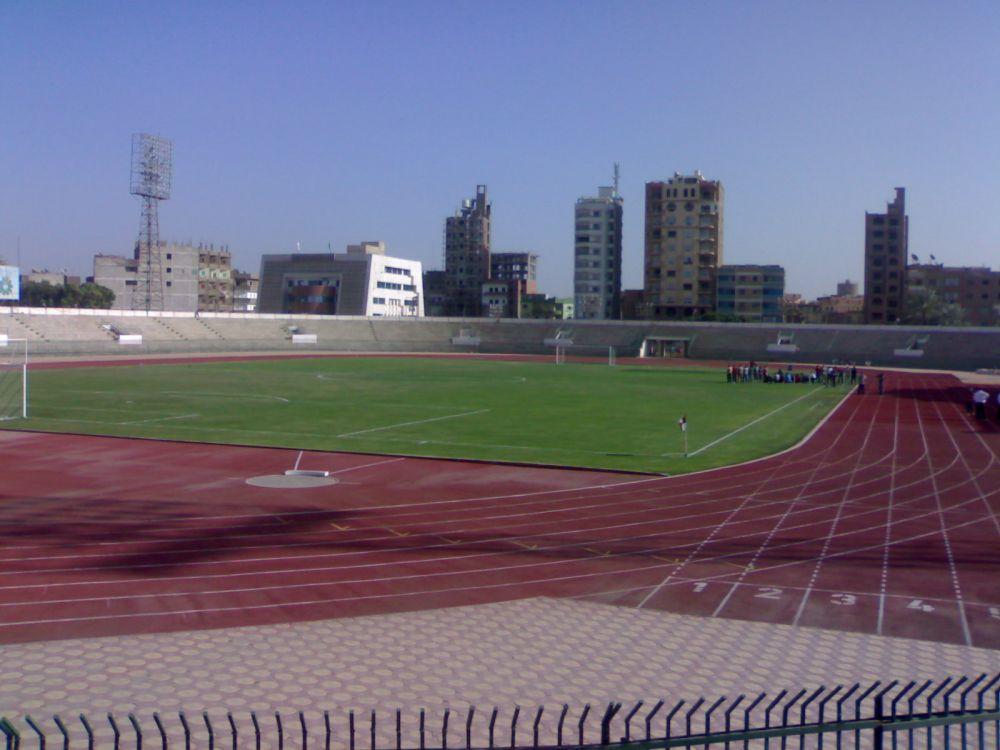
Sohag Stadium

The most popular sport in Sohag is Association football. Sohag has many football clubs, including the Egyptian Premier League (EPL) team Sohag FC. In addition, EPL club has El Gouna FC used Sohag stadium as a home ground at times.

== Notable people ==
Notable people who originate from or live in Sohag include:

- Narmer, the first pharaoh of unified Egypt and the founder of the Early Dynastic Period (c. 32nd century BC)
- Sheikh Mohamed Siddiq El-Minshawi, one of the most renowned Qur'anic reciters of all the Islamic world
- Muhammad Sayyid Tantawy, former imam of Al-Azhar
- Rifa'a el-Tahtawi, writer, teacher, translator, Egyptologist, renaissance intellectual and founder of Madrasat al-Alsun (Tongues School)
- Onsi Sawiris, Billionaire businessman
- Mustafa al-Maraghi, reformer and rector of Al-Azhar Mosque
- Mohammed Aboul-Fotouh Hassab, gastro-intestinal surgeon
- Gamal El-Ghitani, author of historical novels and cultural and political commentaries
- Atef El-Tayeb, film director
- George Sidhom, film actor
- Emad Hamdy, film actor
- Baligh Hamdi, composer who created hit songs for many prominent Arabic singers
- Dhul-Nun al-Misri, Sufi saint considered the patron saint of the physicians in the early Islamic era of Egypt
- Jaber Abu Hussein, narrator of the Taghribat Bani Hilal

== Nearby attractions ==
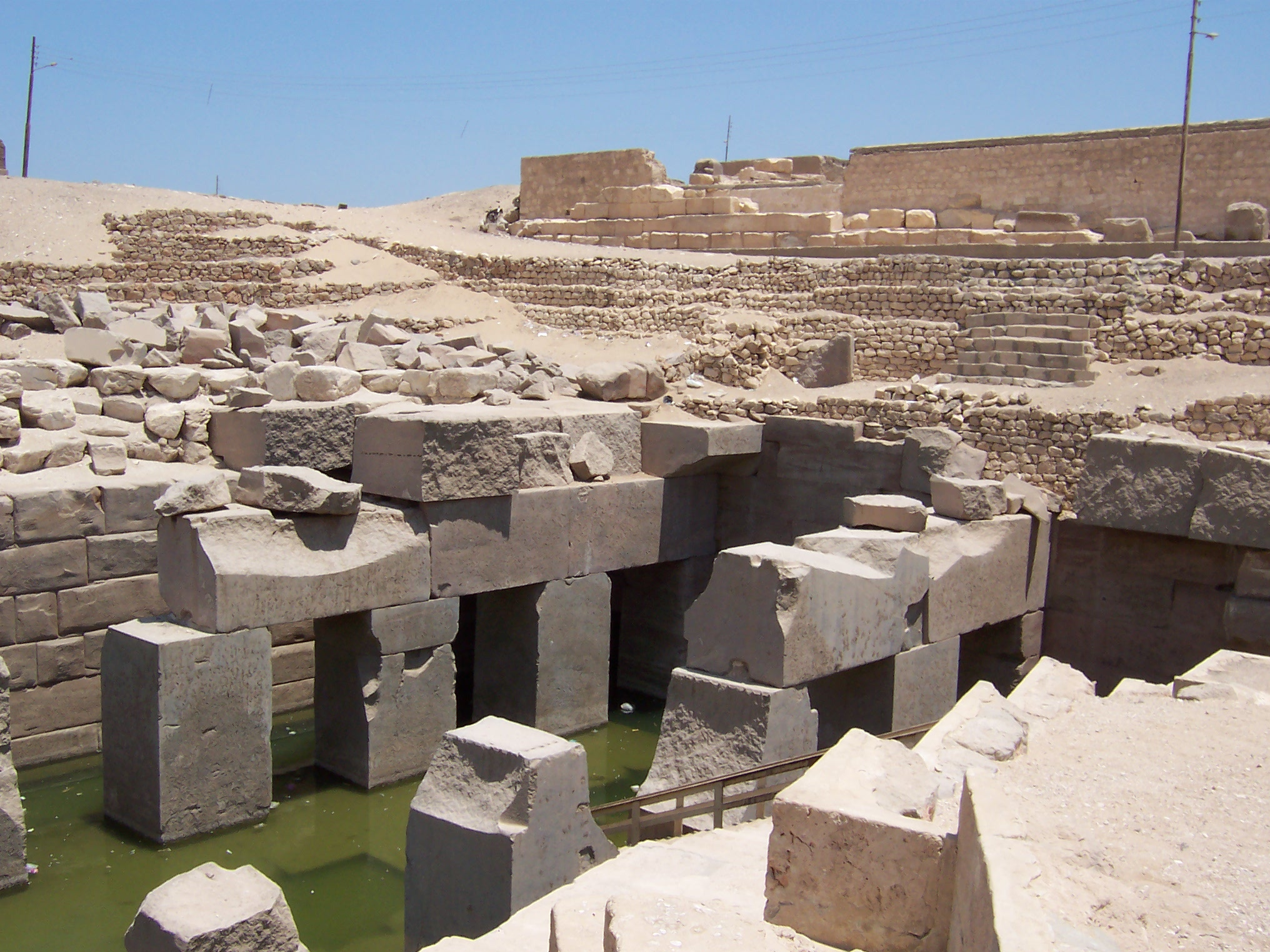
Osireion, Abydos

- Abydos is one of the most ancient cities of Upper Egypt, and also of the eighth Upper Nome, of which it was the capital city. It is considered one of the most important archaeological sites of Ancient Egypt. The sacred city of Abydos was the site of many ancient temples, including a Umm el-Qa'ab, a royal necropolis where early pharaohs were entombed.
- Akhmim has several mosques and two Coptic churches. It maintains a weekly market and manufactures cotton goods.
- El-Hawawish is the ancient necropolis (cemetery) for Akhmim.
- El-Salamuni comprises a rock-cut chapel dedicated to the god Min.
- The Meritamen statue in eastern Akhmim.
- Outside Beit Khallaf are two large brick mastabas from the Third Dynasty.
- The city Athribis is the site of a temple built for the goddess Repyt (Triphis) by Ptolemy XV Caesarion and subsequent Roman Emperors.

== Photo gallery ==
Building in Sohag

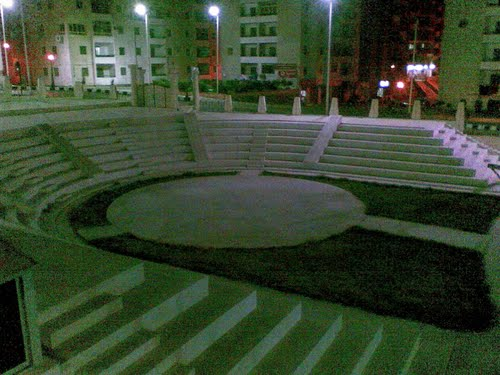
Roman theater

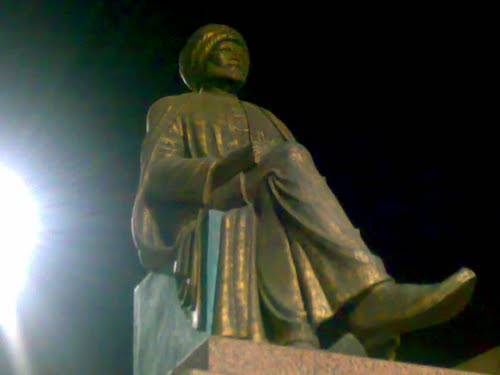
Tahtawy memorial

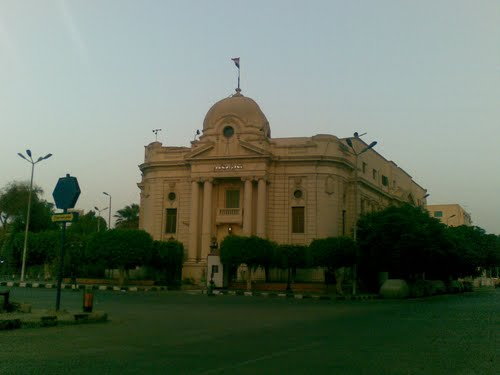
Sohag city hall

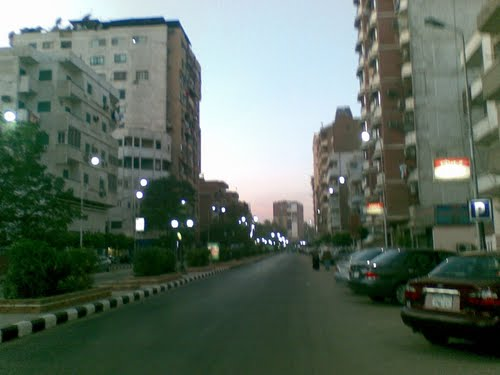
Jumhuriyea St.

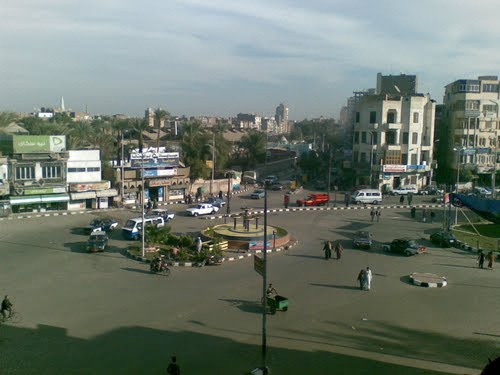
Orouba sq.

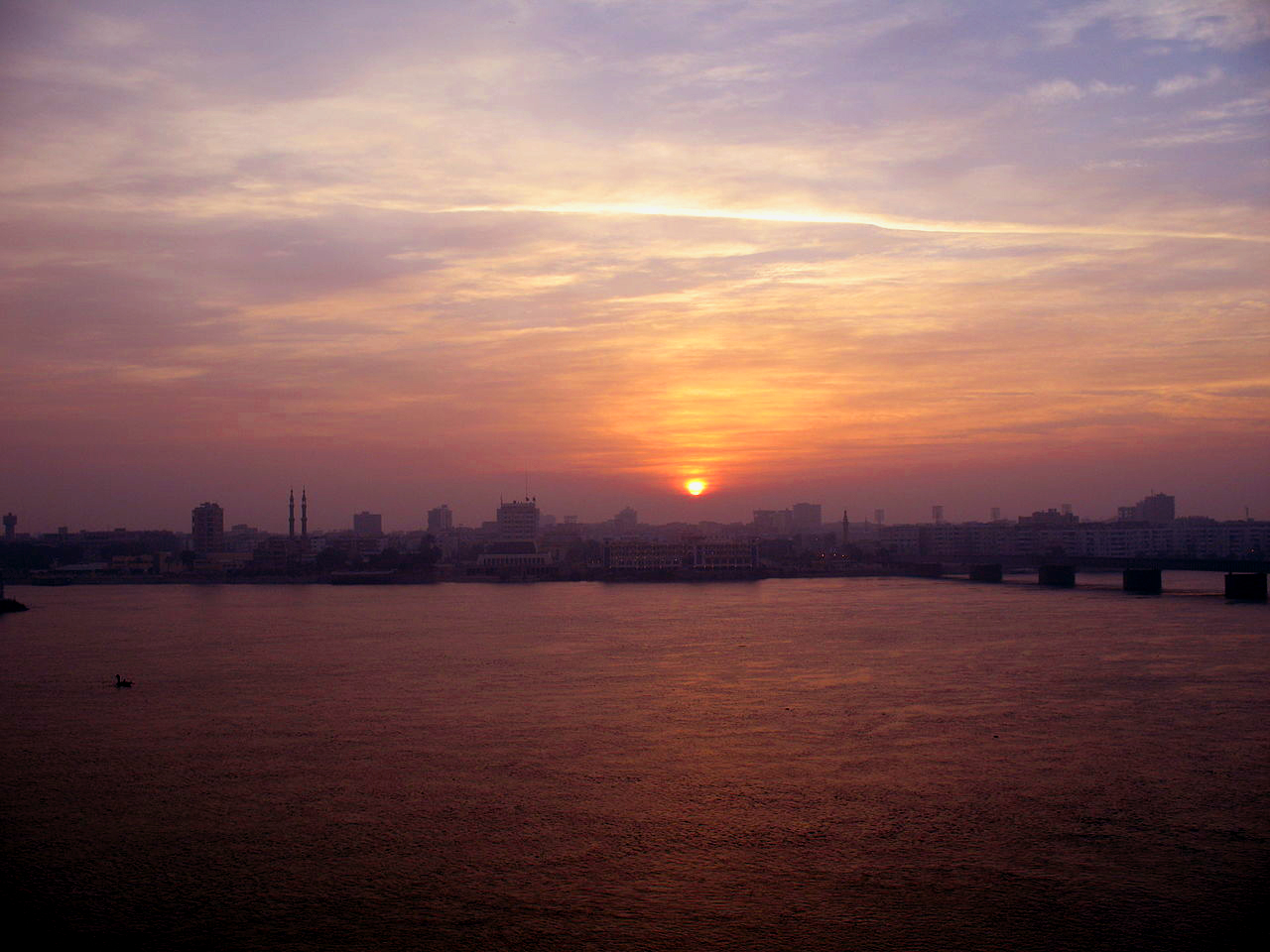
Skyline.

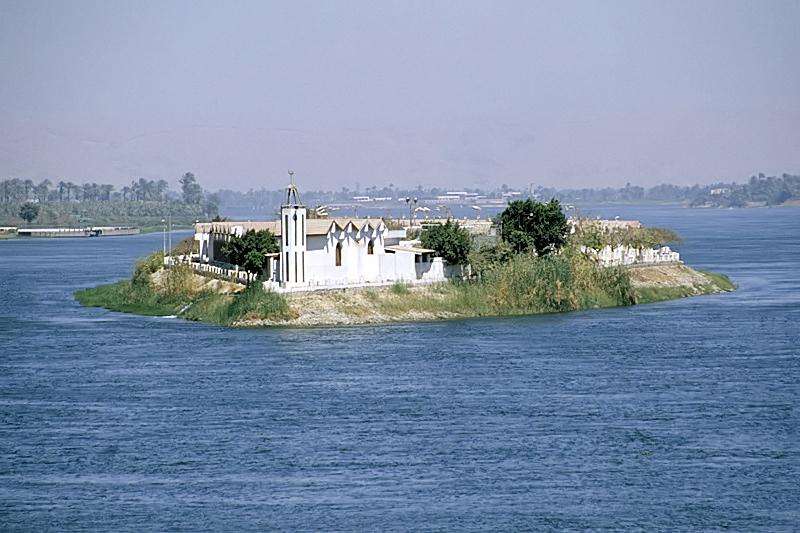
Jazirat Al Zohour .

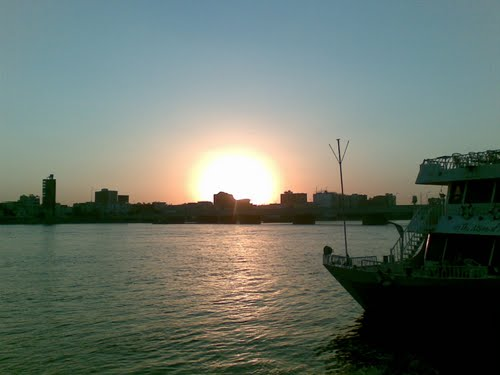
Nile view (east bank)

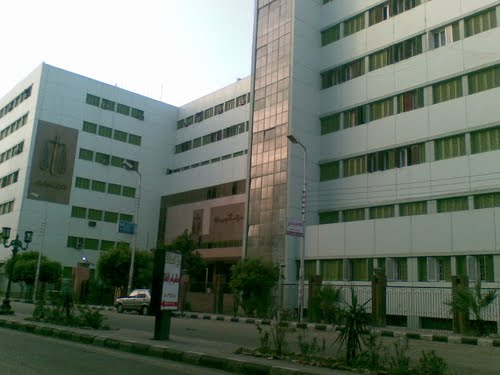
Courts compound

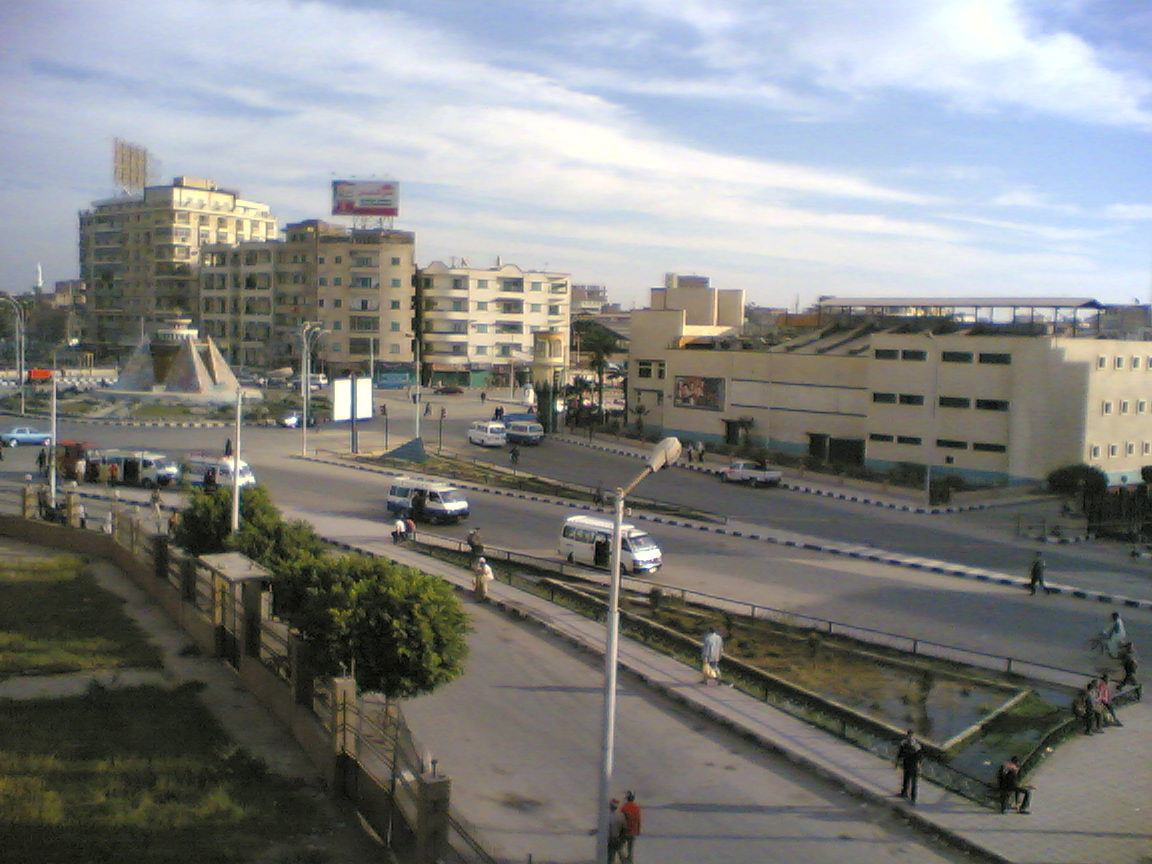
Downtown

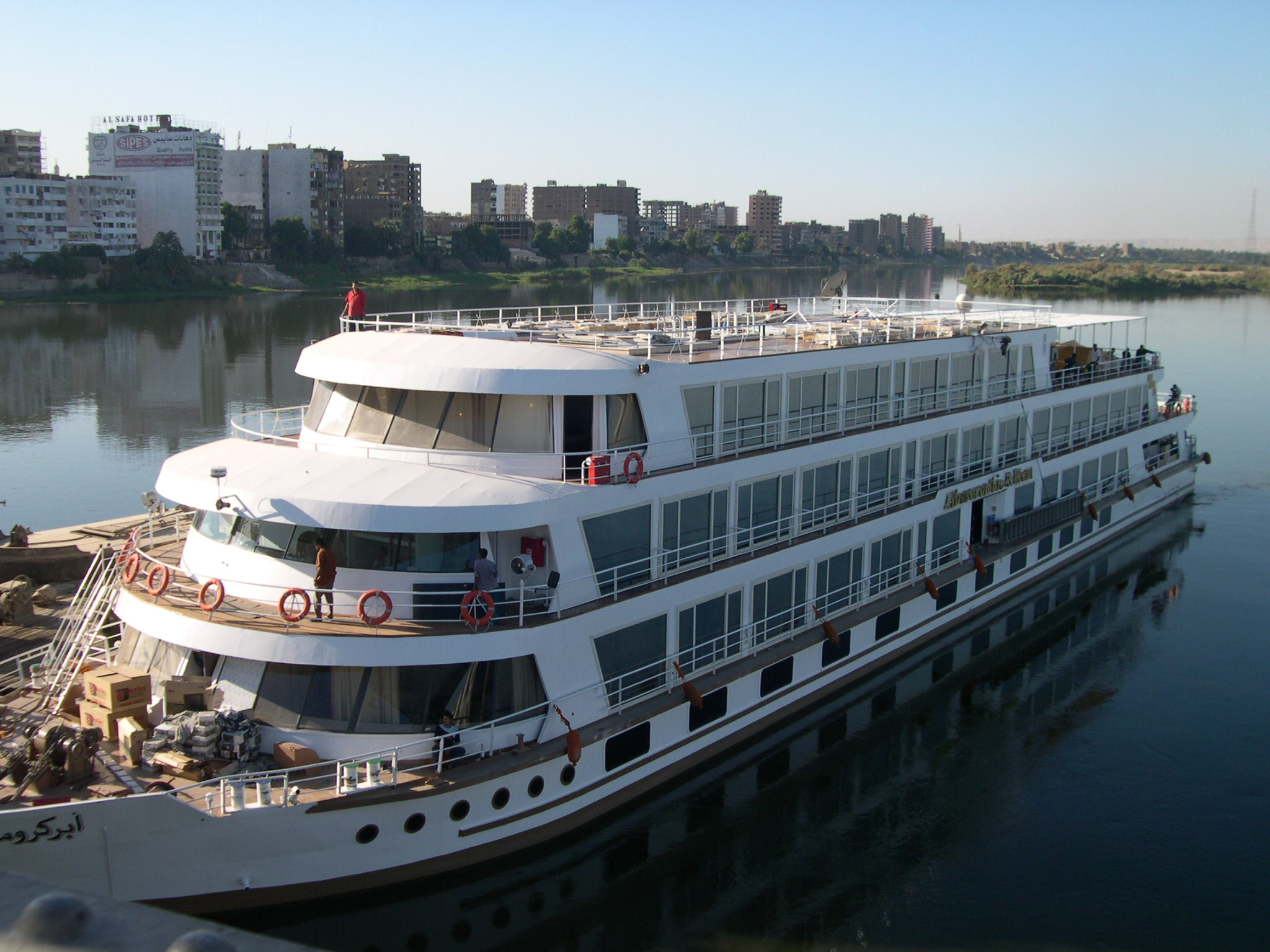
Nile view from Akhmim bridge

== See also ==
- List of cities and towns in Egypt
- Upper Egypt
- Sa'idi people
- Sa'idi Arabic
