= Sidi Arif Mosque =

Mosque in Sohag, Egypt

- مسجد العارف بالله
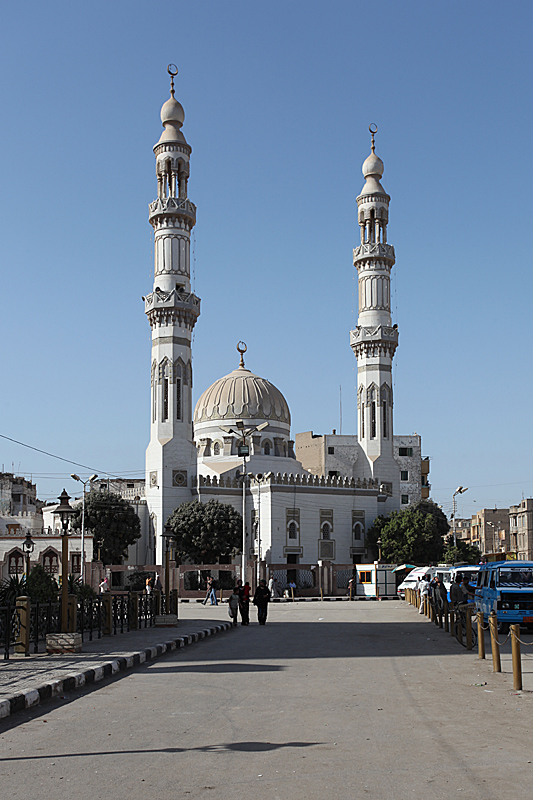

- Location of the mosque in Egypt

Religion
- Affiliation: Sunni Islam
- Rite: Sufism
- Ecclesiastical or organisational status: Mosque and mausoleum
- Status: Active

Location
- Location: Sohag, Sohag Governorate
- Country: Egypt
- Interactive map of Sidi Arif Mosque
- Coordinates: 26°32′54″N 31°42′05″E

Architecture
- Type: Mosque
- Style: Islamic
- Completed: 14th century CE; 1968 (reconstruction)

Specifications
- Capacity: 1,500 worshippers
- Length: 51 m (167 ft)
- Width: 33 m (108 ft)
- Dome: 1
- Dome dia. (outer): 24 m (79 ft)
- Minaret: 2
- Materials: Concrete

The Sidi Arif Mosque (Arabic: مسجد العارف بالله, romanized: Masjid al-Aarif bi Allah) is a mosque and mausoleum, located in Sohag, in the Sohag Governorate of Egypt. It was completed in the 14th century CE and was reconstructed several times; including in 1968 and in 1998. The mosque was named after the Sufi mystic buried in it, Sidi Arif, also known as Ismail ibn Ali ibn Abdussami, a member of the Ashraf family of mystics.

Every year the people of Sohag visit the mosque to celebrate the birthday, or Mawlid, of the saint. The mosque is also visited because of the saint's tomb.

== Architecture ==
The mosque has two minarets and the roof is crowned by a dome, with a large prayer hall with split entrances, segregated for men and women. The tomb of Sidi Arif is located in a room at the end of the mosque.

Next to the mosque is the tomb of Murad Bey, the Mamluk and bey of Egypt who ruled with Ibrahim Pasha.

The mausoleum contains the tombs of the following Sufi mystics Ismail ibn Ali ibn Abdussami and Ahmad ibn Zarruq, not to be confused with Ahmad Zarruq the Maliki-Sufi master. The mausoleum also contains the tomb of Murad Bey Mohammed, bey of Egypt and a Mamluk governor.

== Gallery ==
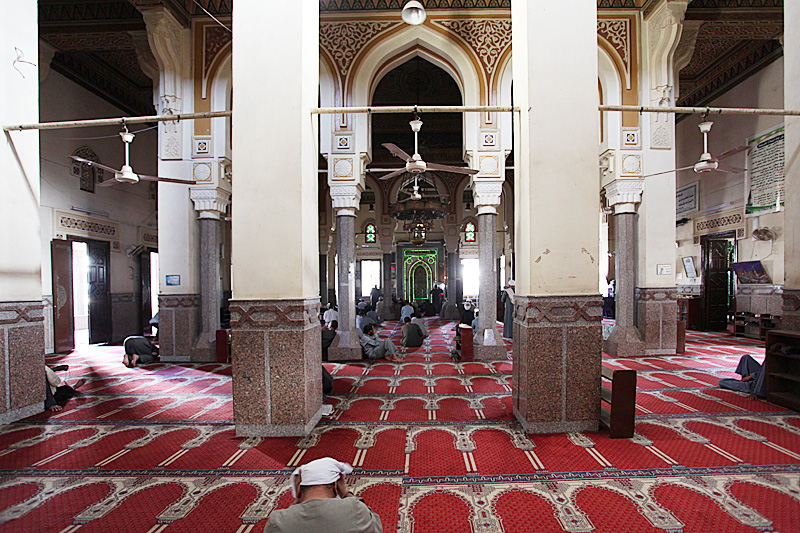
Inside the mosque

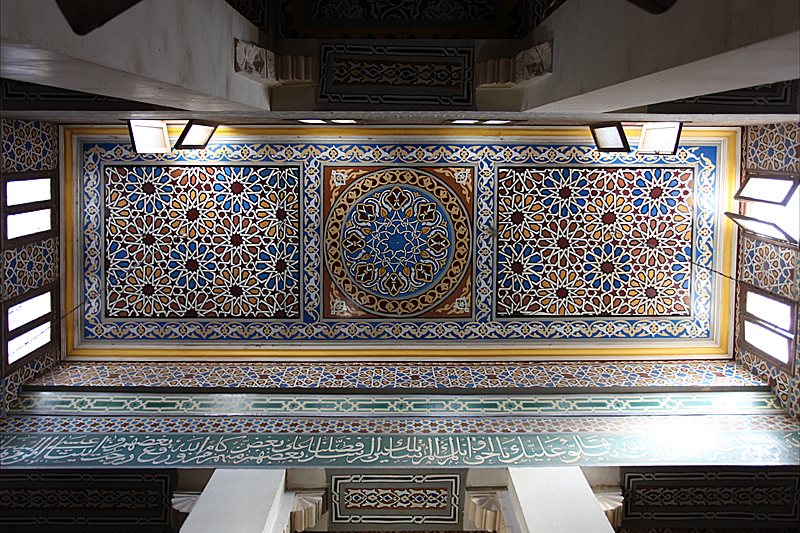
Interior of the mosque dome

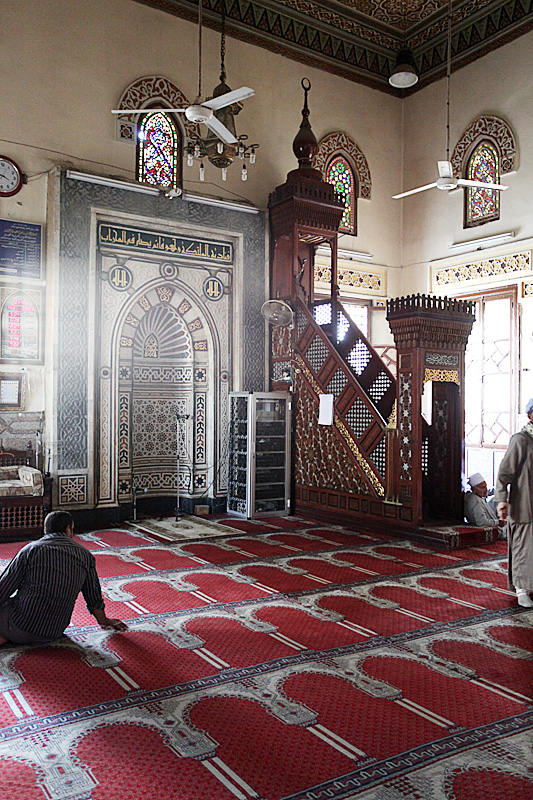
Mihrab and minbar of the mosque

== See also ==
- Islam in Egypt
- List of mosques in Egypt
