= C/1882 F1 (Wells) =

Sungrazing comet

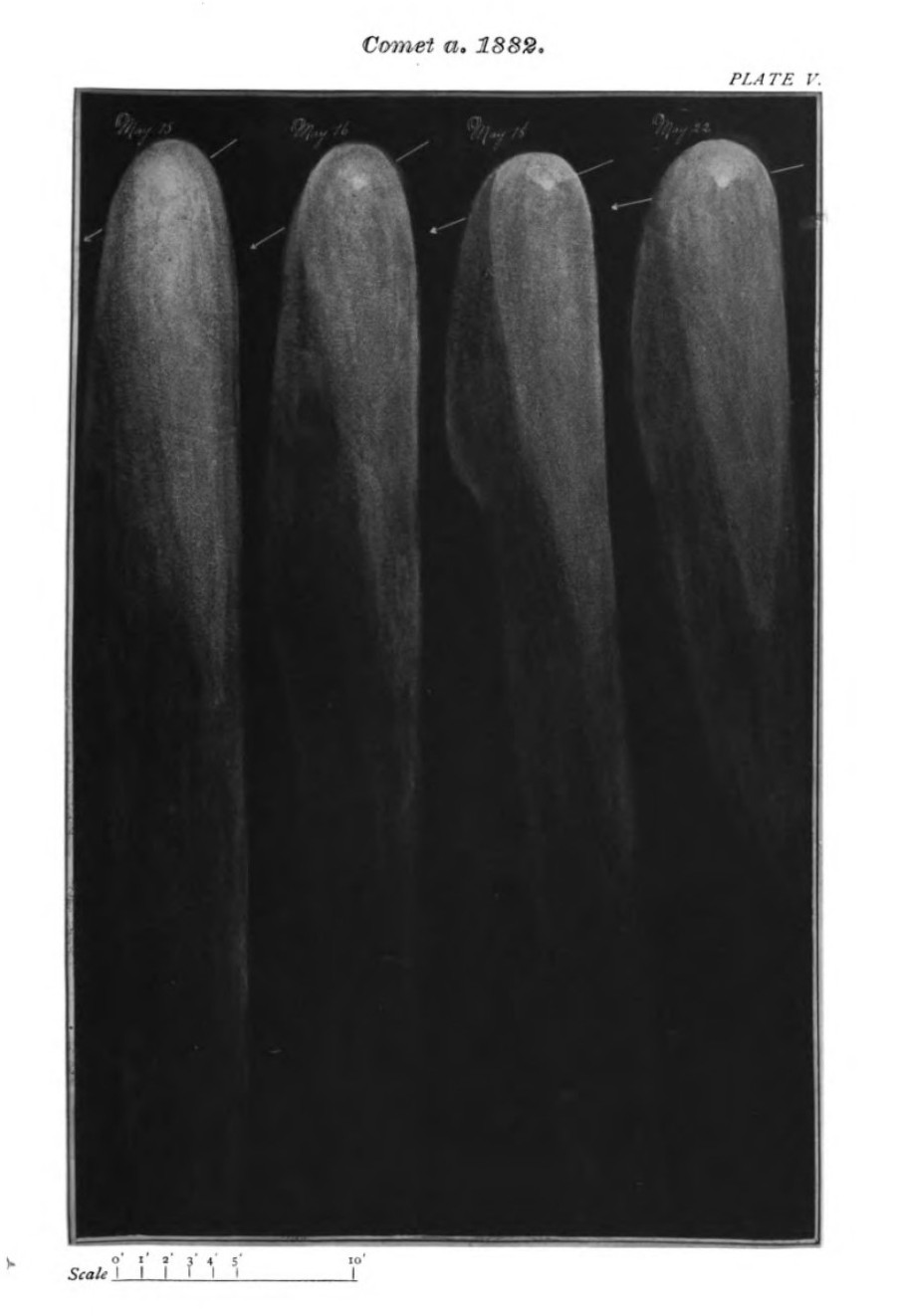
- Approximate sketches of Comet Wells (1882a) drawn on 15–22 May 1882

Discovery
- Discovered by: Charles S. Wells
- Discovery site: Dudley Observatory
- Discovery date: 18 March 1882

Designations
- Alternative designations: 1882 I, 1882a

Orbital characteristics
- Epoch: 20 June 1882 (JD 2408616.5)
- Observation arc: 114 days
- Number of observations: 41
- Aphelion: 17,041 AU
- Perihelion: 0.061 AU
- Semi-major axis: 8,521 AU
- Eccentricity: 0.99999
- Orbital period: ~787,000 years
- Max. orbital speed: 171 km/s
- Inclination: 73.797°
- Longitude of ascending node: 206.589°
- Argument of periapsis: 208.985°
- Last perihelion: 11 June 1882
- T_{Jupiter}: 0.086
- Earth MOID: 0.0084 AU
- Jupiter MOID: 1.3834 AU

Physical characteristics
- Comet total magnitude (M1): 4.1
- Apparent magnitude: –6.0 (1882 apparition)

Comet Wells, formally designated as C/1882 F1, is a parabolic, sungrazing comet that became visible in the naked eye during the early months of 1882. However, unlike the great comet that appeared later that September, it never became prominent enough to be noticed by the general public due to unfavorable positions in the twilight sky. It is the only comet discovered by American astronomer, Charles S. Wells.

== Discovery and observations ==
The comet was discovered from photographic plates taken by Charles S. Wells on the morning of 18 March 1882, a first for the Dudley Observatory in Albany, New York. The observatory's director, Lewis Boss, described the find as a "small and bright" object in the constellation Hercules. (Note: Reported initial position upon discovery was: α = 17^{h} 51.7^{m} , δ = 32° 31′)

The comet was further observed telescopically throughout April 1882 as it gradually approached the Earth. It reached naked-eye visibility the following month as it became a 4th-magnitude object, and was briefly thought to be the same comet observed during the total solar eclipse of 17 May 1882 until later reanalysis revealed it was a different object, now known as X/1882 K1 (Tewfik).

In June 1882, the comet rapidly brightened as it approached perihelion, increasing its brightness to magnitude 0, and a tail measuring 5 degrees in length. However, it never became prominent enough to attract widespread public attention due to it being only briefly observable for brief periods in twilight. Despite this, several astronomers did manage to see the comet in broad daylight, by this time it has reached its peak magnitude of –6.0, making it one of the brightest comets ever recorded alongside the later Great Comet of September 1882.

== See also ==
- X/1882 K1 (Tewfik)
- C/1882 R1, also known as the Great Comet of 1882
