= Sa'idi joke =

A Sa'idi joke is a type of ethnic joke in Egyptian popular culture that makes fun of Upper Egyptians, often relying on stereotypes and derogatory characteristics associated with the region and its inhabitants. Sa'idi jokes are a form of regional humour that is usually told in Egyptian Arabic.

Sa'idi jokes frequently portray their protagonists as unintelligent, naïve, stubborn, or unfamiliar with urban life. Their humour often relies on misunderstandings, exaggerated behaviour, and mockery of the Sa'idi dialect. These portrayals reflect stereotypes about Upper Egyptians.

== History and social context ==
Sa'idi jokes are part of the social representation of Upper Egyptians in Egyptian society. Anthropological and sociological studies have examined the stereotypes associated with Upper Egyptians and how they appear in everyday life and popular culture.

Some works on Egyptian popular culture and mass media show that Sa'idi characters have often been portrayed as unintelligent or backward, and that exaggerated Sa'idi dialects have been used in jokes and comedic performances.

== Characteristics ==
Sa'idi jokes commonly rely on several recurring themes, including portraying Sa'idi characters as naïve or unintelligent, as well as making fun of the Sa'idi dialect.

The Sa'idi dialect is frequently represented in Egyptian jokes and is associated with stereotypes of ignorance, stupidity, and lack of sophistication.
