= Sa'idi Arabic =

Variety of Arabic spoken by Upper Egyptians

- Upper Egyptian Arabic
- صعيدى
- Native to: Egypt
- Region: Al Minya Governorate and south to Sudan border; Red Sea area; Cairo area
- Ethnicity: Sa'idis
- Speakers: 27 million (2024)
- Language family: Afro-Asiatic: Semitic; West Semitic; Central Semitic; Arabic; Sa'idi Arabic
- Writing system: Arabic alphabet

Language codes
- ISO 639-3: aec
- Glottolog: said1239
- Linguasphere: 12-AAC-eb
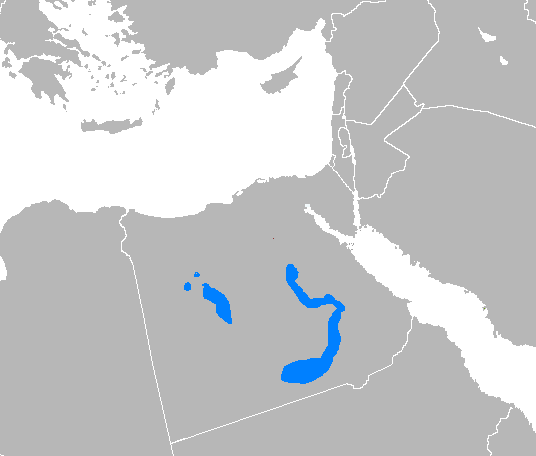

Sa'idi Arabic (autonym: صعيدى [sˤɑˈʕiːdi], Egyptian Arabic: [sˤeˈʕiːdi]), or Upper Egyptian Arabic, is a variety of Arabic spoken by the Upper Egyptians in the area that is South/Upper Egypt, a strip of land on both sides of the Nile that extends from Aswan and downriver (northwards) to Lower Egypt.

Sa'idi Arabic is a sub-dialect of Egyptian Arabic spoken primarily in Upper Egypt. It carries little prestige nationally but continues to be widely spoken.

There is no single unified Sa'idi Arabic spoken throughout Upper Egypt. Instead, the region comprises a group of related dialects that vary by locality and governorate. In the provincial capitals and larger urban centers of Upper Egypt, many inhabitants commonly speak Egyptian Arabic, which is often perceived as the prestige or urban variety.

== Dialects ==
There is no single unified Sa'idi Arabic spoken throughout Upper Egypt. Instead, it comprises a group of related dialects that vary by region and locality. These differences include pronunciation, vocabulary, and certain grammatical features, and noticeable variation may exist between the dialects of northern and southern Upper Egypt. In the provincial capitals and larger urban centers, many inhabitants speak Egyptian Arabic alongside local Sa'idi varieties, as Egyptian Arabic is more widely associated with urban life.

== Phonology ==
=== Consonants ===
Sa'idi Arabic has the following consonants:

		Bilabial	Dental/Alveolar		Palatal	Velar	Uvular	Pharyngeal	Glottal
		Bilabial	plain	emph.	Palatal	Velar	Uvular	Pharyngeal	Glottal
Nasal		m	n						
Plosive/ Affricate	voiceless		t	tˤ	t͡ʃ	k			ʔ
Plosive/ Affricate	voiced	b	d	dˤ	d͡ʒ^{*}	ɡ			
Fricative	voiceless	f	s	sˤ	ʃ		χ	ħ	h
Fricative	voiced		z	zˤ	(ʒ)		ʁ	ʕ	
Trill			r						
Approximant		w	l		j				

- ^* /d͡ʒ/ may also be realised as [ʒ] or as [d], when it merges with /d/.
- /dʒ/ is heard as [ɟ] in the southern Upper Egyptian dialects.
- An emphatic /tˤ/ may also have a glottalized allophone of [tˀ] in complementary distribution.

=== Vowels ===
	Front	Central	Back
High	i iː		u uː
Mid	(e) eː	[ə]	(o) oː
Low	a aː		

- Sounds /e, o/ appear in the Qifṭi or southern dialects.
- /a/ can also be heard with an allophone of [ə].
- Vowels may also have pharyngeal (emphatic) allophones as well.

Vowel allophones
Phoneme	Allophones	Emphatic /Vˤ/
/i/	[i], [ɪ]	[ɨˤ], [ɨ̞ˤ], [ɨ], [ɨ̞]
/iː/	[iː], [ɪː]	[ɨ̞ˤː], [ɨ̞ː]
/eː/	[eː], [ɛː], [e], [ɛ]	[ɛˤː], [ɛˤ], [ɛ], [ɜ], [ɛː]
/a/	[ä], [æ]	[ɑˤ], [ɑ]
/aː/	[äː], [æː]	[ɑːˤ], [ɑː]
/oː/	[oː], [ɔː], [o], [o̞], [ɔ]	[o̞ˤː], [ɔˤ], [o̞], [ɔ], [o̞ː]
/u/	[u], [ʊ]	[ʊˤ], [ʊ]
/uː/	[uː], [ʊː]	[ʊˤː], [ʊː]

== See also ==
- Varieties of Arabic
- Sa'idi people
- Copts
- Nubians
- Egyptian Arabic

== Sources ==
- Khalafallah, Abdelghany A. (1969). A Descriptive Grammar of Sa'i:di Egyptian Colloquial Arabic. The Hague: Mouton. LCCN 68-17886.
- Nishio, Tetsuo (1994). The Arabic dialect of Qifṭ (Upper Egypt): grammar and classified vocabulary. Asian and African lexicon series. Vol. 27. Tokyo: Institute for the Study of Languages and Cultures of Asia and Africa (ILCAA), Tokyo University of Foreign Studies.
- Versteegh, Kees (2001). The Arabic Language. Edinburgh: Edinburgh University Press. ISBN 0-7486-1436-2.
