= Bompae =

Bompae (Ancient Greek: Βομπαή) was a village in the nomos of Panopolis in Roman Egypt. It is attested in Greek documentary papyri and mummy labels from the Roman period, including labels using the formula apo Bompae ("from Bompae").

Bompae has been identified with the area of modern Sohag in Upper Egypt, although this identification is not certain. It is based in part on Roman-period mummy labels from Sohag that mention Bompae.

== Bibliography ==
- Sethe, Kurt (1897). "Bompaë". Realencyclopädie der klassischen Altertumswissenschaft. Vol. III, 1. Stuttgart: J. B. Metzler. col. 682.
- Chauveau, Michel. "Rive droite, rive gauche. Le nome panopolite au IIe et IIIe siècles de notre ère". In Egberts, A.; Muhs, B. P.; van der Vliet, J. (eds.), Perspectives on Panopolis: An Egyptian Town from Alexander the Great to the Arab Conquest. Papyrologica Lugduno-Batava 31. Brill, 2002, pp. 47–54.
