= Horapollo =

Egyptian writer

Horapollon
- Born: c. 5th century AD; Nilopolis, Arcadia, Egypt
- Died: c. 5th century AD; Roman Egypt
- Occupations: Grammarian, Grammar, Philosophy, Writer
- Years active: c. 5th century AD
- Notable work: Hieroglyphica

Horapollo (from Horus Apollo; Ancient Greek: Ὡραπόλλων; fl. c. 5th century AD) is the supposed author of a treatise, titled Hieroglyphica, on Egyptian hieroglyphs, extant in a Greek translation by a Philippus (also dating to c. 5th century).

== Life ==
Horapollo is mentioned by the Suda (ω 159) as an Egyptian teacher in Alexandria, during the reign of Zeno (AD 474–491).

The Suda gives the names of two men named Horapollo, and one or the other may have been the author of Hieroglyphica. Both the younger and elder Horapollo, the grandfather, may be characterized as students of both the Egyptian god-worship tradition and Greek philosophy, but the lost Egyptian learning they tried to cobble together and reconstruct were a mix of the genuine and spurious.

The elder Horapollo is mentioned in the Suda as a grammarian from Phenebythis, under Theodosius II (408–450). The younger Horapollo was an Egyptian of the same name, who lived in the reign of Zeno, 474–491). This elder Horapollo wrote commentaries on Sophocles, Alcaeus of Mytilene and Homer, and a work (Ancient Greek: Τεμενικά, "Names for Temples") on places consecrated to the gods. Photius (cod. 279), who calls him a dramatist as well as a grammarian, ascribes to him a history of the foundation and antiquities of Alexandria. Timotheus of Gaza, whose treatises on animals impacted Byzantine and Arabic scientific literature, was one of his pupils.

It is to the elder Horapollo the Hieroglyphica was attributed by most 16th-century editors, although there were more occult opinions, identifying Horapollo with Horus himself, or with a pharaoh.

Later evidence associates him with the pagan intellectual circle around Alexandria. In this account, Horapollo was questioned about the whereabouts of the pagan priest Harpocras and was tortured, but he did not immediately become a Christian; rather, he remained secretly attached to the traditional gods for a time before eventually converting to Christianity.

== Hieroglyphica ==
The text of the Hieroglyphica (Ἱερογλυφικά) consists of two books, containing a total of 189 explanations of Egyptian hieroglyphs. The books profess to be a translation from an Egyptian (i.e. Coptic) original into Greek by a certain Philippus, of whom nothing else is known. The inferior Greek of the translation, and the character of the additions in the second book point to its being of late date; some have even assigned it to the 15th century. The text was discovered in 1419 on the island of Andros, and was taken to Florence by Cristoforo Buondelmonti (it is today kept at the Biblioteca Laurenziana, Plut. 69,27). By the end of the 15th century, the text became immensely popular among humanists and was translated into Latin by Giorgio Valla (in ms. Vat. lat. 3898). The first printed edition of the text appeared in 1505 (published by Manuzio), and was translated into Latin in 1517 by Filippo Fasanini, initiating a long sequence of editions and translations. From the 18th century, the book's authenticity was called into question, but modern Egyptology regards at least the first book as based on real knowledge of hieroglyphs, although confused, and with baroque symbolism and theological speculation, and the book may well originate with the latest remnants of the Egyptian priesthood of the 5th century.

Though a very large proportion of the statements seem absurd and cannot be accounted for by anything known in the latest and most fanciful usage, there is ample evidence in both books, in individual cases, that the tradition of the values of the hieroglyphic signs was not yet extinct in the days of their author.

This approach of symbolic speculation about hieroglyphs (many of which were originally simple phonetic signs) was popular during Hellenism, whence the early Humanists, down to Athanasius Kircher, inherited the preconception of the hieroglyphs as a magical, symbolic, ideographic script. In 1556, the Italian humanist Pierio Valeriano Bolzani published a vast Hieroglyphica at Michael Isingrin's printing press in Basel, which was originally planned as an exegesis of Horapollo's. It was dedicated to Cosimo I de' Medici.

The second part of book II treats animal symbolism and allegory, in the Greek tradition, essentially derived from Aristotle, Aelian, Pliny, Artemidorus, and the Physiologus, etc. and is probably an addition by the Greek translator.

Editions by C. Leemans (1835) and A. T. Cory (1840) with English translation and notes; see also G. Rathgeber in Ersch and Gruber's Allgemeine Encyclopädie; H. Schafer, Zeitschrift für ägyptische Sprache (1905), p. 72.

== Select editions ==
- Horapollo (1505). Aldus Manutius, Venice (editio princeps)
- —— (1950 ) Translated by Boas, George. New York: Bollingen Foundation Inc., reprinted 1993 ISBN 0-691-00092-1.
- —— (2002) [1940]. Sbordone, Francesco (ed.). Hori Apollinis Hieroglyphica. Hildesheim: Georg Olms Verlag. ISBN 3-487-41885-1.
- Orapollo (1996), I geroglifici, Rizzoli (in Italian) ISBN 88-17-16997-8.

== See also ==
- Hermes Trismegistos

== Bibliography ==
- Horapollo (1993) [1950]. The Hieroglyphics of Horapollo. Translated by Boas, George. Foreword by Anthony T. Grafton. Princeton University Press. ISBN 0-691-00092-1.
- Wildish, Mark (2017). The Hieroglyphics of Horapollo Nilous: Hieroglyphic Semantics in Late Antiquity. Routledge. ISBN 978-1-351-37653-2.
