= Sa'idi people =

Upper Egyptians (Sa'idis) صعايدة ⲛⲓⲣⲉⲙⲣⲏⲥ
Saa'yda
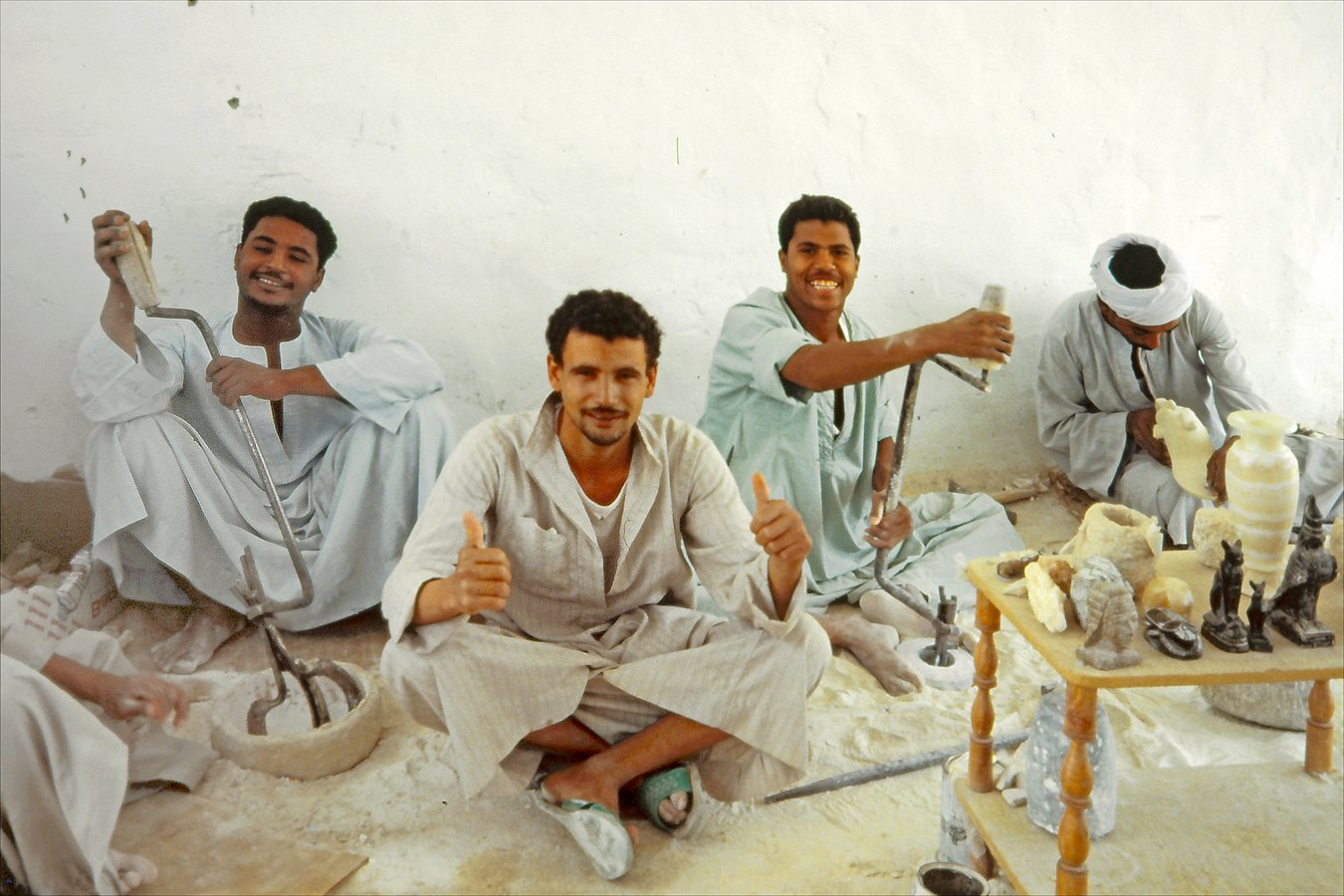
- Luxor stone workers in a village at Medinet Habu

Total population
- ca. 32,051,000 (30.4% of Egypt's domestic population) (2023 estimate)

Languages
- Sa'idi Arabic; Egyptian Arabic (auxiliary)

Religion
- Predominantly Islam

A Sa'idi (Egyptian Arabic: صعيدي, Coptic: ⲣⲉⲙⲣⲏⲥ Remris) is a person from Upper Egypt (Arabic: صعيد مصر, Coptic: ⲙⲁⲣⲏⲥ Maris).

== Etymology ==
The word Sa'idi is derived from al-Sa'id, the Arabic name for Upper Egypt. In Arabic, sa'id means highland or elevated land. The suffix -i is added to sa'id to form a relational adjective indicating origin or affiliation. Thus, Sa'idi refers to a person from or belonging to the Sa'id region.

In Coptic, specifically Sahidic, the expression ⲣⲉⲙⲣⲏⲥ (Rem-rīs) referred to a man from the south. Another expression, ⲣⲉⲙ(ⲡ)ⲙⲁⲣⲏⲥ (Rem-pma-rīs or Rem-ma-rīs), referred to a man from the Southern Country, meaning Upper Egypt.

== Socioeconomic status ==
Approximately 30% of Egyptians live in Upper Egypt, and 80% of Egypt's severe poverty is concentrated in Upper Egypt. Most Sa'idi people are fellahin, and they live in closely knit villages along the Nile Valley in Egypt. Sa'idis are the poorest and most illiterate population group in Egypt.

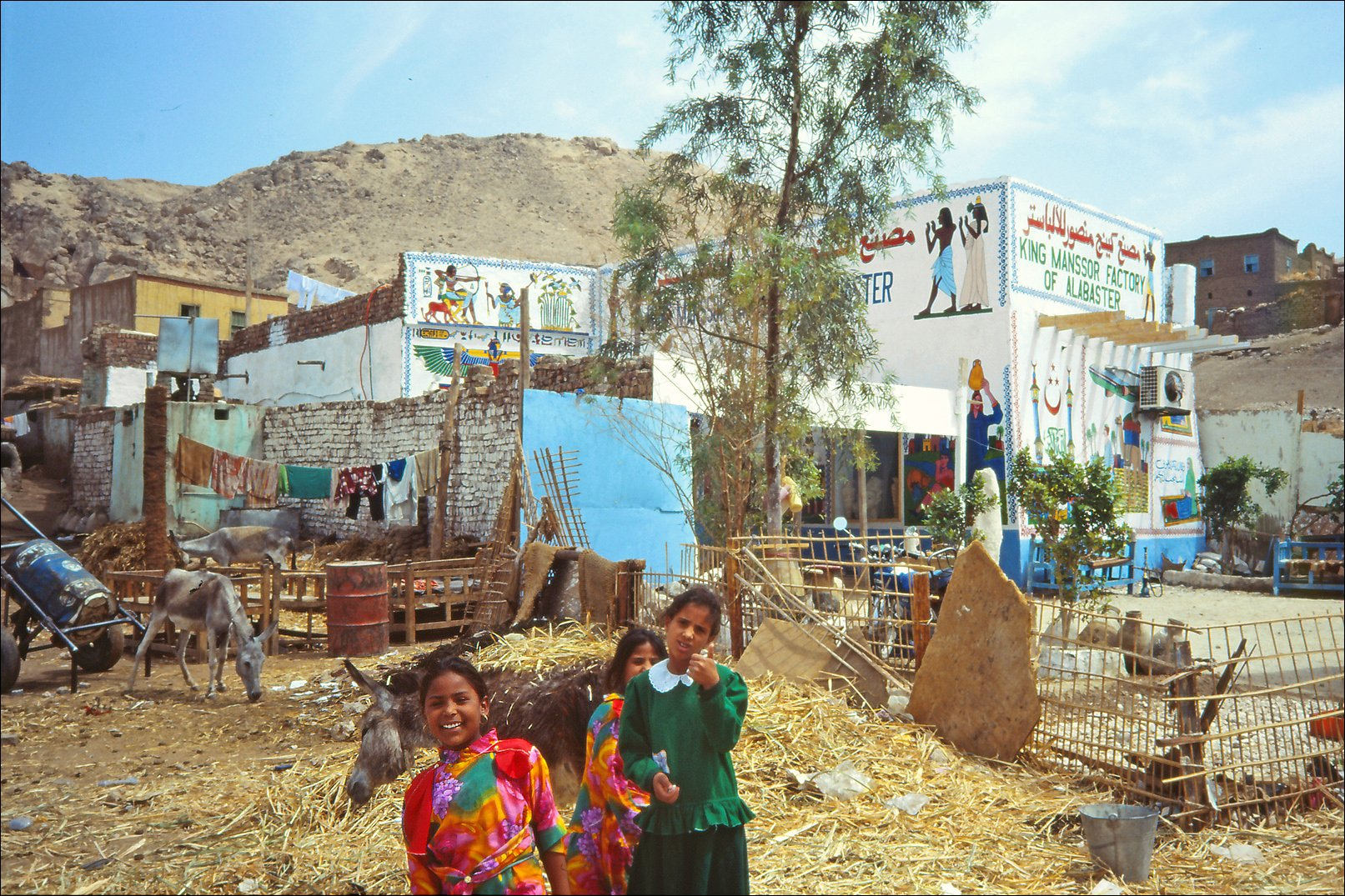
Rural Egyptian children outside an alabaster shop

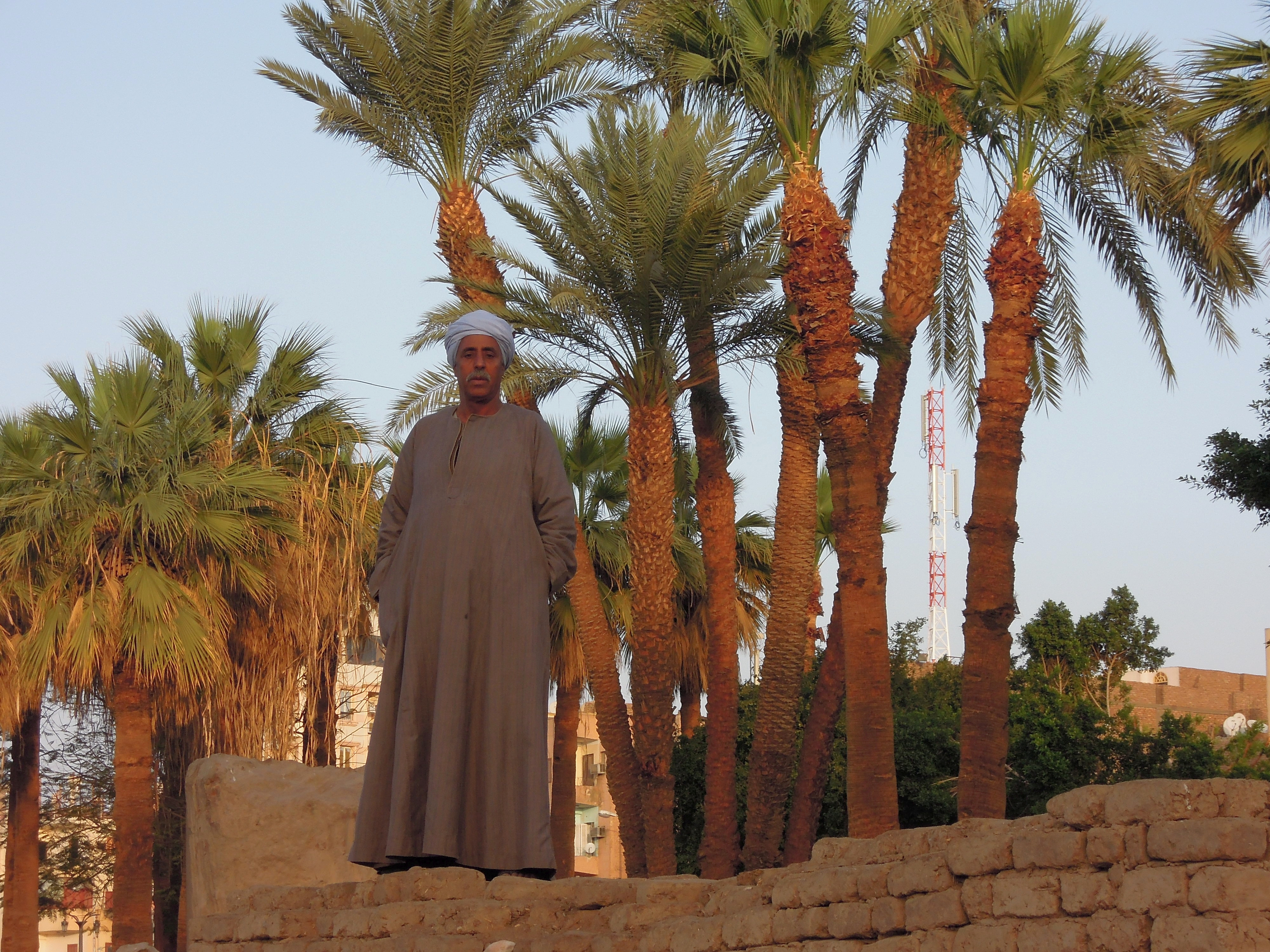
A Sa'idi man in traditional attire called a jellabiya

=== Stereotypes and jokes ===
Sa'idis and their dialect are the subject of numerous Egyptian stereotypes and ethnic jokes, including Sa'idi jokes, mainly from the upper-class Egyptians who own businesses in Egypt's major cities and that hire Upper Egyptian workers in construction fields. They are popularly assumed to be rural simpletons by other Egyptians. An example of such stereotyping is the popular 1998 film Sa'idi fil-Gama'a al-Amrikiya ("A Sa'idi in the American University") starring Mohamed Henedi, whose main character is portrayed as less fashionable than the other Egyptian students of the American University in Cairo.

== Religion in Upper Egypt ==
The Upper Egyptians follow Islam and Christianity as the majority of Christians in Egypt live in Upper Egypt, and a large proportion of Upper Egypt's population are Christians. Upper Egypt has a rich Coptic Christian history. For instance, Sahidic was the leading Coptic dialect in the pre-Islamic period. In the last few decades the high proportion of Coptic Christians in Upper Egypt has enabled some Christians to hold prominent political posts there. For instance, Qena Governorate had a Coptic Christian governor in 2011. Sahidic dialect of Coptic is used as a liturgical language by the clergy and among Sa'idi Coptic Christians.

== Relationship to other Egyptians ==
Upper Egyptians share close historical, cultural, and genetic ties with other Egyptian populations. Genomic studies using STR analysis indicated broad similarities between Upper Egypt and the nation's other regions, and they do not constitute a genetically separate group. Using autosomal sequencing methods, Upper Egyptian Muslims and Coptic Christians from the same area were genetically related, with both sharing local ancestral components. The paternal ancestry of Southern Egyptians is composed of haplogroup markers and lineages that are common in other Egyptian populations.

== See also ==
- Beja people
- Culture of Egypt
- Fellah
- Hawwara
- History of Egypt
- Nubians
- Saʽidi Arabic (the dialect spoken by Sa'idis)
- Sahidic Coptic
- Siwi people
- Tahtib
- Upper and Lower Egypt
