= Bahraini cuisine =

Culinary traditions of Bahrain

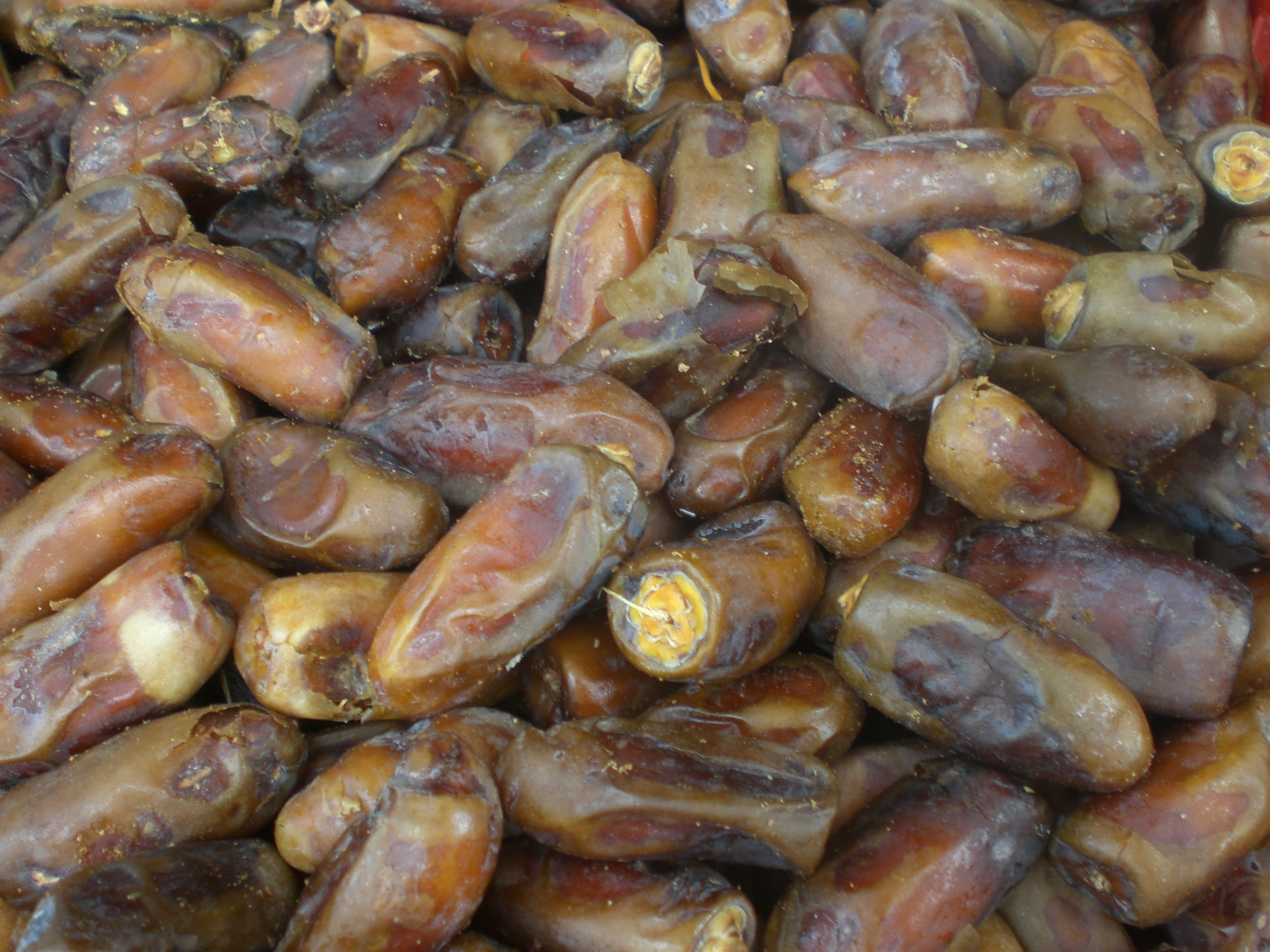
Dried dates

The cuisine of Bahrain consists of dishes such as biryani, harees, khabeesa, machboos, mahyawa, quzi and zalabia. Arabic coffee (qahwah) is the national beverage.

Bahrain is a small island state near the western shores of the Persian Gulf. Much of the cuisine of Bahrain is a mixture of Arabic, Iranian (national, Balochi, and Achomi cuisine), Indian, African, Far East and European food due to the influence of the various communities present, as Bahrain has been an important seaport and trading junction since ancient times.

== Dishes ==
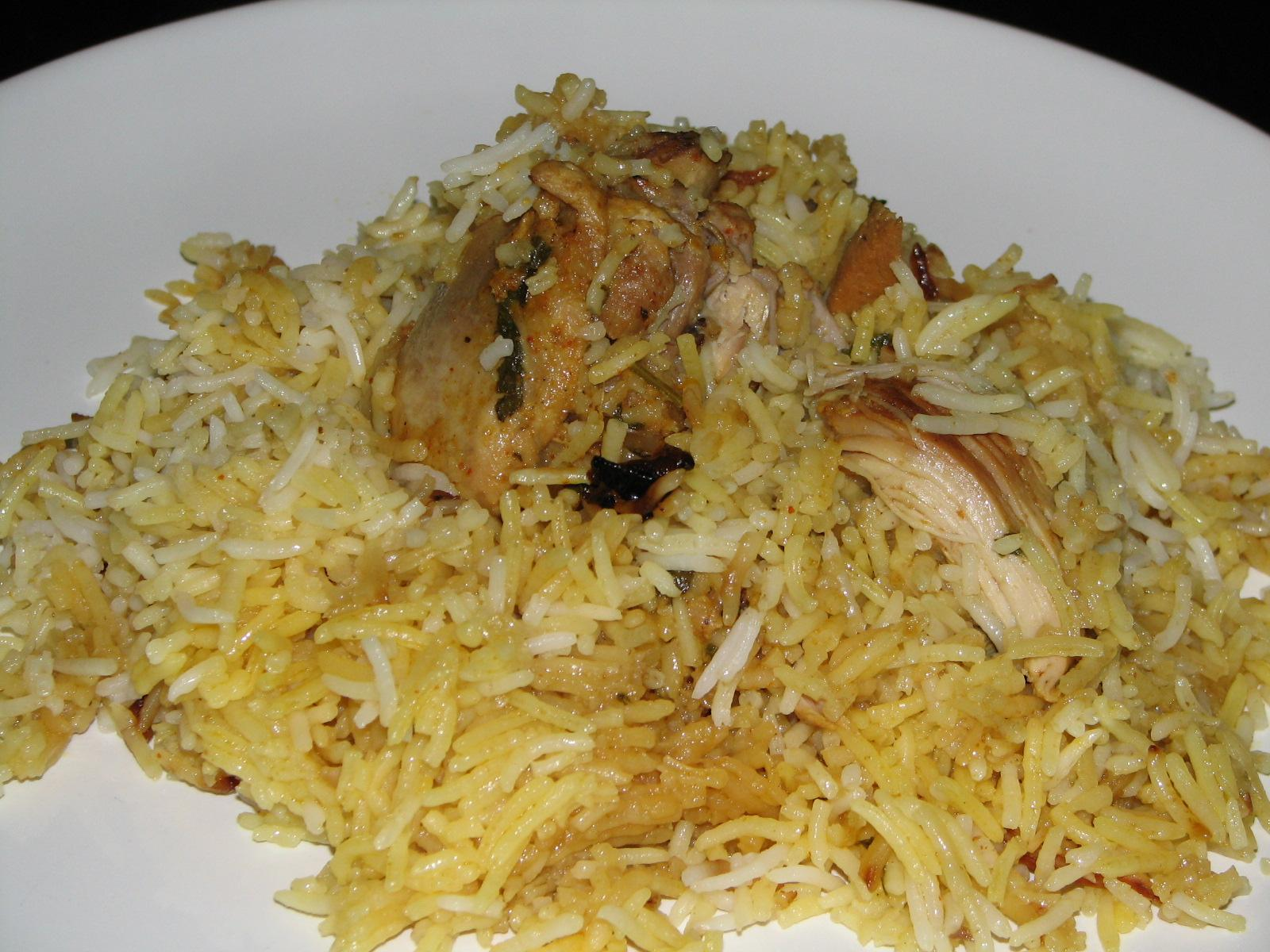
Biryani with chicken

Some of the common dishes prepared in Bahraini households are:

- Masli (Arabic: المصلي) – rice cooked with chicken, meat, fish or shrimp with the ingredients cooked directly in the pot
- Biryani (Arabic: برياني) – heavily seasoned rice cooked with chicken or lamb, originally from the Indian subcontinent
- Fi ga'atah (Arabic: في قاعته) or taht al aysh (Arabic: تحت العيش) – white rice cooked with tomatoes, potatoes and eggplant in the bottom of the pan
- Harees (Arabic: هريس) – wheat cooked with meat, then mashed; usually topped with cinnamon sugar
- Jireesh (yireesh) (Arabic: جريش) – a mash of cooked spelt with chicken or lamb, tomatoes and spices
- Machboos (Arabic: مجبوس) – mutton, chicken or fish served over fragrant rice that has been cooked in a well-spiced chicken or mutton broth
- Mahyawa (Arabic: مهياوة) – a tangy fish sauce
- Mumawwash, (Arabic: مموش) – rice cooked with green lentils; can be topped with dry shrimp
- Muhammar (Arabic: محمر) – rice dish made from local rice with dates or sugar and one of the most distinctive rice dishes in Bahrain, always served with fried fish, especially the net fish of Bahrain
- Quzi (ghoozi) (Arabic: قوزي أو غوزي) – roasted lamb stuffed with rice, meat, eggs and other ingredients
- Falafel (Arabic: فلافل) – fried fava beans served as fried balls in sandwiches with vegetables
- Al-Mudalal (Arabic: المدلل) – rice cooked with herbs and mixed with small pieces of chicken, and finished with a special kind of butter, specifically prepared for this dish
- Malgoum – shawarma served inside chapati or paratha bread with cheese, French fries, and a variety of sauces
- Fūl (Arabic: فول) – a stew of cooked fava beans served with olive oil, cumin, and optionally with chopped parsley, garlic, onion, lemon juice, chili pepper and other vegetables, herbs, and spices

== Desserts ==
- Bahraini Halwa (Arabic: حلوى بحرينية) – a traditional dessert made from starch, sugar, nuts, saffron, rose water, and cardamom.
- Ghuraiba (Arabic: الغريبة) – brittle cookies made from flour, butter, powdered sugar and cardamom, usually served with Arabic coffee
- Qirs altaabi - dish made of flour, eggs and ground cardamom to make a paste that is heated on a hot surface.
- Khabeesa (Arabic: الخبيص) – Sweet dish made of flour and oil.
- Gaimat, (Arabic: قيمات) or luqaimat – Sweet fried yeast dumplings soaked in saffron syrup (sugar, lemon and saffron) or honey or date molasses
- Khanfaroosh, (Arabic: خنفروش) – popular fried dessert prepared using molasses or milk, usually served at breakfast with tea or coffee
- Zalabia (Arabic: زلابية) – fried dough soaked in syrup (sugar, lemon and saffron) with a distinctive swirly shape

== Typical Bahraini beverages ==
Qahwah is the national beverage while tea, particularly karak, is drunk for hospitality. Other popular beverages include laban (a kind of salty buttermilk), yoghurt drinks, sharbat (sweet drinks) like rose sharbat or rose with milk, and soft drinks.

Bahrain produces only a small amount of its food requirements due to limited land space and imports much of its food.

== See also ==
- Arab cuisine
