= Baharna =

Indigenous Shia Muslim inhabitants of the Persian Gulf

Bahārna البحارنة
Regions with significant populations
- Indigenous to Eastern Arabia (Bahrain, Qatif, Al-Hasa), with notable presence in Kuwait, UAE, Zanzibar, Iraq (Najaf and Karbala), and Iran (Hormozgan province)

Languages
- Arabic (Bahrani Arabic, Bahraini Gulf Arabic)

Religion
- Shia Islam (Present)

Related ethnic groups
- Khuzestani Arabs, Omani Arabs, Najdi Arabs, Dhofari Arabs, Shihuh, Habus, Kuwaiti Arabs, Emirati Arabs, Qatari Arabs

The Bahārna (Arabic: بُحارنة, romanized: Buharnah; or Arabic: بَحارنه, romanized: Baharneh), are an ethnoreligious group of Shia Muslim Arabs from the historical region of Bahrain. Generally regarded by scholars as the original inhabitants of Eastern Arabia, most Bahraini citizens are Baharna. They inhabited the region before the arrival of the Banu Utbah, from which the Bahraini royal family descends, in the 18th century.

Outside contemporary Bahrain, Baharna populations are found throughout Eastern Arabia (Bahrain, Qatif, and al-Ahsa). There are also significant populations in Kuwait, United Arab Emirates, Qatar, Oman, Iraq (specifically Najaf and Karbala), as well as Khorramshahr and Hormozgan province in Iran. Additionally, some have migrated to Eastern Africa (Zanzibar in particular), Europe and America as well.

== Origin ==
The origin of the Baharna is debated, and there are different theories regarding their origins. Several Western scholars believe that the Baharna originate from Bahrain's ancient pre-Islamic population which consisted of partially-Christianized Arabs, Aramaic-speaking agriculturalists, Persian Zoroastrians, and a small number of Jews. According to one historian, Arab settlements in Bahrain may have begun around 300 B.C., and control of the island was maintained by the Rab'iah tribe that eventually converted to Islam in 630 A.D.

Local anecdotal evidence suggests that the Baharna's ancestry is diverse, as some word variants spoken in the dialects of the native people of the villages of Bani Jamra and A'ali are only used in places such as Yemen and Oman, indicating southern Arabian ancestry.

Most Baharna families and clans claim descent from the Rab’ia tribe. However, the direct relation is often contested. While some trace ancestry to the Abd al-Qays, who were mostly Nestorian Christians (Church of the East) before the seventh century, others trace their ancestry to the Anizah tribe (a cousin tribe of the Abd Al-Qays). Some among them also claim ancestry to Bakr Bin Wail. Furthermore, other families trace their heritage to the other influential tribal conglomeration of northern pre-Islamic Arabia, the Banu Mudar, through the Banu Tamim tribe who ruled Bahrain during the early Islamic era. Illustrating the tribal mosaic of the Baharna, many other clans trace their heritage to Al-Azd, from Yemen.

According to Robert Bertram Serjeant, the Baharna may be the last of the "descendants of converts from the original population of Christians (Aramaeans), Jews and ancient Iranians (referred to by Arabs at the time as Majus) inhabiting the island and cultivated coastal provinces of Eastern Arabia at the time of the Arab conquest".

These claims are also supported by archaeological finds, as archaeologists uncovered Parthian (247 BC – 224 CE) related artefacts in Shah-khoura, and a Christian church in Samaheej (Imperial Aramaic: ܡܫܡܗܝܓ, romanized: Māshmāhīg) dated between the mid-4th and mid-8th centuries CE.

They are considered to be the original inhabitants of Bahrain, as such, there is no indication that a population replacement happened to the Dilmunites.

The "Baharnah" mainly trace their lineages to these tribes:

- Abd al-Qays
- Rabi'ah
- Bakr ibn Wa'il
- Banu Tamim
- Al-Azd
- Musawi Sayyid Descent (Qarooni, Alawi, Musawi, Qaheri....)

=== Genetics ===
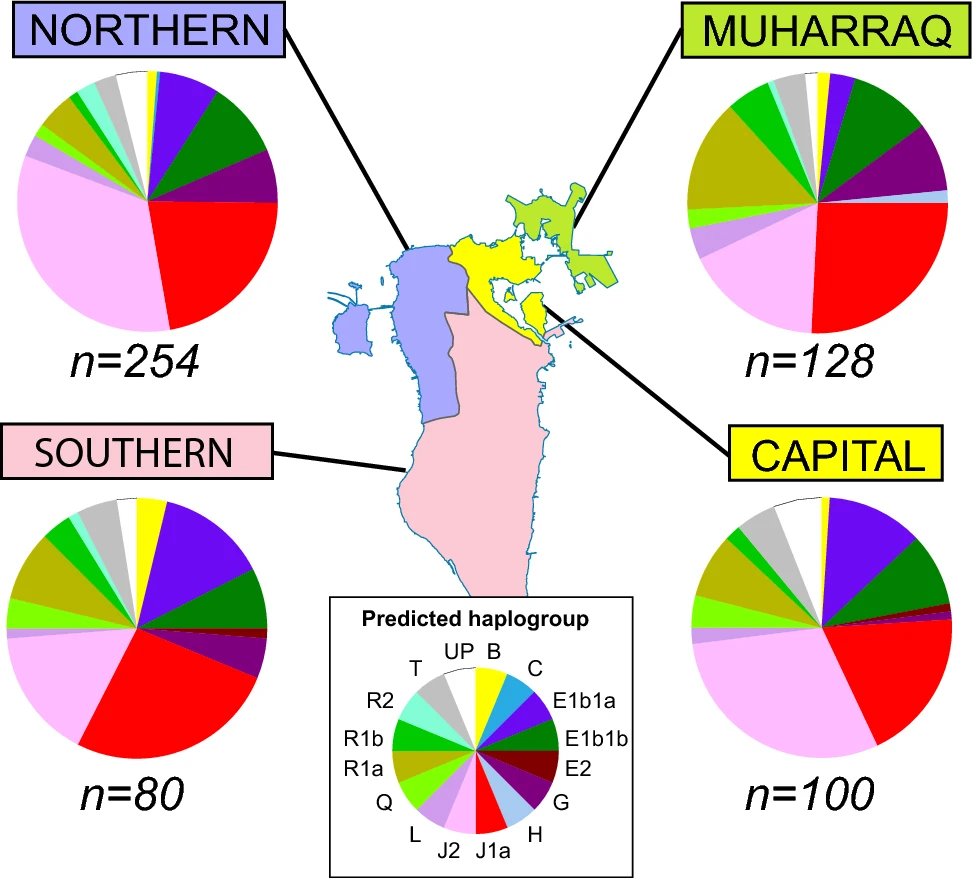
Proportions of predicted Y-DNA haplogroups observed in the four governorates of Bahrain (Study of 2020)

A 2024 genomic study sequenced whole genomes from four individuals who lived in Bahrain during the Tylos period (circa 300 BCE – 600 CE). The results revealed that ancient Bahrainis possessed a composite genetic profile, primarily derived from ancient populations of the Near East. Their ancestry was best modelled as a mixture of ancient Anatolian, Levantine, and Iranian/Caucasian sources, reflecting Bahrain's historical position as a crossroads of regional populations. Subtle genetic variation among the four individuals indicated internal diversity even before the Islamic era—one individual showed stronger Levantine affinities, while others were genetically closer to groups from Iran and the Caucasus. Comparisons with modern populations showed that these ancient Bahrainis shared closer genetic affinities with present-day peoples of Iraq and the Levant than with those of the central Arabian Peninsula.

Complementing this, a Y-chromosome study of 562 Bahraini males found that haplogroup J2—often associated with populations of Iran, the Caucasus, and Mesopotamia—was the most prevalent lineage in Bahrain, accounting for 26.7% of all samples. This was followed by haplogroup J1 (22.9%), E1b1b (17.4%), and R1a (8.0%). Sub-regional analysis revealed that J2 was the dominant haplogroup in all governorates, with its highest concentration in the Northern Governorate (85 out of 254 samples). These results align with the genetic continuity observed between ancient and modern Bahrainis, especially among the Baharna and Ajam, whose Y-lineages show strong affinities to populations of the northern Arabian Gulf and southwestern Iran rather than the central Arabian Peninsula. Certain families seem to also show affinity to J2, including Al-Alawi, Al-Musawi, Al-Qassab and others. This is also true of the general population in the northern and capital governates, both in ancient and present times.

Some Baharna and Ajams likely intermixed, giving many Bahrainis claim to Iranian descent. Furthermore, a significant portion of the Baharna, along with many Emiratis, can trace part of their ancestry to Persian roots, often through a grandmother from two or three generations ago during the pre-oil era. This connection might position them as a distinct intermediate or mixed ethnic group.

Additionally, some subgroups of Baharna have had recurring migrations between Bahrain and Khouzestan, notably the Al-Qarooni family (said to be named after a man called Qaroon/Karun who is traced to the lineage of Musa Al-Khadim), who have had to re-migrate after the Persian harassment campaign against the Arabs of Mohammerah intensified, after they were involved in an Arab Nationalist movement. Some of them speak a variant of Mesopotamian Arabic. Some of them are shown by some samples to have an affinity to the J2 Haplogroup (belonging to the J-BY44557 branch), indicating continuous presence since ancient times.

== Etymology ==
The term Bahrani serves to distinguish the Baharna from other Kuwaiti or Bahraini ethnic groups, such as the ethnic Bahraini-Iranians who fall under the term Ajam, as well as from the Sunni Arabs in Bahrain who are known as Al Arab ("Arabs"), such as Bani Utbah. In the United Arab Emirates, the Baharna make up 5% of Emiratis and are generally descended from Baharna coming around 100–200 years ago.

In Arabic, bahrayn is the dual form of bahr ("sea"), so al-Bahrayn means "the Two Seas". However, which two seas were originally intended remains in dispute. The term appears five times in the Qur'an, but does not refer to the modern island—originally known to the Arabs as "Awal".

Today, Bahrain's "two seas" are instead generally taken to be the bay east and west of the island, the seas north and south of the island, or the salt and fresh water present above and below the ground. In addition to wells, there are places in the sea north of Bahrain where fresh water bubbles up in the middle of the salt water, noted by visitors since antiquity.

An alternate theory offered by al-Ahsa was that the two seas were the Persian Gulf and a peaceful lake on the mainland Near Al-Ahsa, known as Al-Asfar Lake; still another provided by Ismail ibn Hammad al-Jawhari is that the more formal name Bahri (lit. "belonging to the sea") would have been misunderstood and so was opted against.

== Language ==
tilmunû ša ina sūse elippušu iṭbû anāku

𒋾𒀭𒈬𒌦𒌑 𒊭 𒀀𒈾 𒋦𒍢 𒂊𒇷𒅗𒉺𒊒𒍑 𒀀𒋫𒁍 𒀀𒈾𒀭𒆠

تِلمُونُ شَ إِنا سُوسِ إِلِپّوشُ إِطْبُو أَناكُ

I am a man from Dilmun whose boat has sunk in the marshes.

— The Assyrian Dictionary of the Oriental Institute of the University of Chicago (CAD)

=== Pre-Arabization ===
Prior to Arabic, it is likely that the Baharnah spoke Syriac Aramaic (ܣܘܪܝܝܐ), preceded by Akkadian, which was used during the Dilmun era and was written in Cuneiform.

=== Bahrani Arabic ===
The Bahrani Arabic dialect, which is a bit different from Bahraini Gulf Dialect and other Gulf Arabic dialects, is one of the dialects of the Arabic language, spoken by the people of the Kingdom of Bahrain in rural areas, as well as by the inhabitants of Qatif Governorate in eastern Saudi Arabia.

The Bahrani Arabic dialect exhibits Akkadian, Aramaic, Syriac and Parsig features. The sedentary people of pre-Islamic Bahrain were Aramaic speakers and to some degree Middle Persian (Pahlavi) speakers, while Syriac functioned as a liturgical language.

Linguistic anthropologist Clive Holes says with regards to the Bahrani dialect and its Akkadian roots:

Farming and material culture terms exist in the Bahãrna dialects which have no plausible Arabic cognates but which turn up in Akkadian and/or Aramaic (as borrowings from Akkadian) with the same meanings as they have in Bahãrna Arabic.

These words are certainly not recent borrowings, and in fact appear to be substrate elements which hark back to a period when the ancestors of today's Bahärna Arabic speakers were speaking a different Semitic language (Aramaic?), or a form of Arabic heavily influenced by Akkadian or Aramaic.

In other words, the tradition which identifies the Bahãrna with the 'original' inhabitants of Bahrain and eastern Arabia may not be all that wide of the mark.

— Clive Holes, Dialect, Culture, and Society in Eastern Arabia: Glossary By Clive Holes. Page XXIX

The Bahrani dialect is spoken in two forms: the traditional old form (known as Halayliyya) and the modern form used today. Its vocabulary is divided into several sub-varieties, including:

- The general Bahrani dialect, which is widespread in most villages and areas of Bahrain and is closely related to the Iraqi dialect.
- The dialect of Sitra Island residents ("ستراوي, satrawi"), used only in Sitra and its surroundings, differing slightly from the main Bahrani dialect.
- The dialect of A’ali and Buri residents, which is a middle form between the general dialect and that of Sitra, characterized by heavier pronunciation.
- The dialect of Manama and Ras Rumman residents, known for its calm tone and closest resemblance to the Qatif dialect.
- The dialect of Diraz residents.

Notes on the Bahrani dialect:

- The letter k (ك) is changed to sh (ش) in feminine words — a feature known as shanshana.
  - Example: Yā l-mas‘ada jātsh ḥamātsh (“Oh happy one, your mother-in-law came”).
- The letter dh/the (ذ) is pronounced as d (د).
  - Example: hādhāk → hadāk (“that one”).
- The letter ẓ (ظ) is pronounced as ḍ (ض).
  - Example: bi-ḥifẓ Allāh → bi-ḥfaḍ Allāh (“with God's protection”).
- The letter qāf (ق) is pronounced as the Egyptian g (ج) / Persian g (گ) or the hard g sound (as in “go”).
  - Example: qāl → jāl or gal (“he said”).
- The letter qāf (ق) is also sometimes softened to j (ج).
  - Example: ṣadīq → ṣadīj (“friend”).
- The letter th (ث) is changed to f (ف).
  - Example: thalātha → falāfa (“three”).
- The addition of the -n (ن) sound to some words in the second-person form.
  - Example: ’inti → ’intīn (“you [feminine]”), ’antum → ’intūn (“you [plural]”).

Only Bahrani Arabic has a different pronoun for female "I" (MSA: أنا, romanized: ana), and like other gulf dialects it includes the “ga” (گ) and “ch” (چ) sounds, below are some examples of that:

Bahrani Arabic	Bahraini Gulf Arabic	English Translation
هاده ويشو, hadah waysho	هاذي شنو, hathy sheno	what is this?
انه امبا فلاف سندويچات, anah omba falaf sandawichat	آنه ابي ثلاث سندويچات, aneh aby thalath sandawechat	I want three sandwiches
حگ ویه/ویش, hag wayh/waysh	حگ شنو, hag shino	For what?
اني تعبانه, ani ta'abanah (feminine) انه تعبان, anah ta'aban (masculine)	آنه تعبانه, āneh ta'abanah (feminine) آنه تعبان, āneh ta'abān (masculine)	I am tired

== Culture ==
=== Traditional Crafts ===
The Baharnah are known for their handcrafts and have been known so for many years, these crafts include:

- Weaving: Artisans use palm leaves to create mats (sofra), baskets, fans, and more, particularly in Karbabad and Jasra.
- Pottery (Arabic: صناعة الفخار) : The village of Al-Ali is famous for its ceramics, alongside other pottery traditions found across the island.
- Dhow Building or Ship building (Arabic: صناعة السُفُن): A highly respected art form, with shipyards in Manama and Muharraq known for building traditional wooden boats.
- Metalwork: Artisans excel in copper and gold work, creating intricate jewelry and decorative items.
- Embroidery & Textiles: Traditional textiles and embroidery are also significant crafts.

=== Proverbs ===
The Baharnah have various local proverbs, for example:

Bahrani Arabic	English Translation	Context
حتى المتوت نعمة الله, hata el-matot nemat allah	Even the “matut” is a blessing from God	It highlights the idea of appreciating any blessing, especially in times of scarcity. The “matut” being the Anchovy fish used in the making of Maheyawa, likely referencing the culture brought in by the Achums.
يوم خلص الشي جت العجوز تمشي, youm khalas elshy jat al ajooz temshy	When the thing finished, the granny (old woman) came walking	It's often used to comment on someone's tardiness or ineffectiveness.
مد رجولك على قد لحافك, med 'rjolok ala gad lehafuk	Stretch your legs only as far as your blanket allows.	This proverb advises living within one's means and not overreaching. It's a metaphor for being practical and understanding one's limits.
البيت بيت أبونا والقوم حاربونا, el-bait bait abuna, wa el-qoom harabona	The house is our father's house, and the tribe/people fought us	Used to express feelings of injustice or frustration when one is deprived of something that they feel rightfully belongs to them.

=== Cuisine ===
These are some of the most common dishes among the Baharnah:

- Machboos (Arabic: مچبوس, romanized: machboos), which is generally common around the Gulf region.
- Dried salted fish known as (Arabic: لِحلِه, romanized: Lehleh).
- Ṣāfī (Arabic: صافي, romanized: safi), served with white rice or sweet rice (Muhammar), a very popular dish in Bahrain.

=== Clothes ===
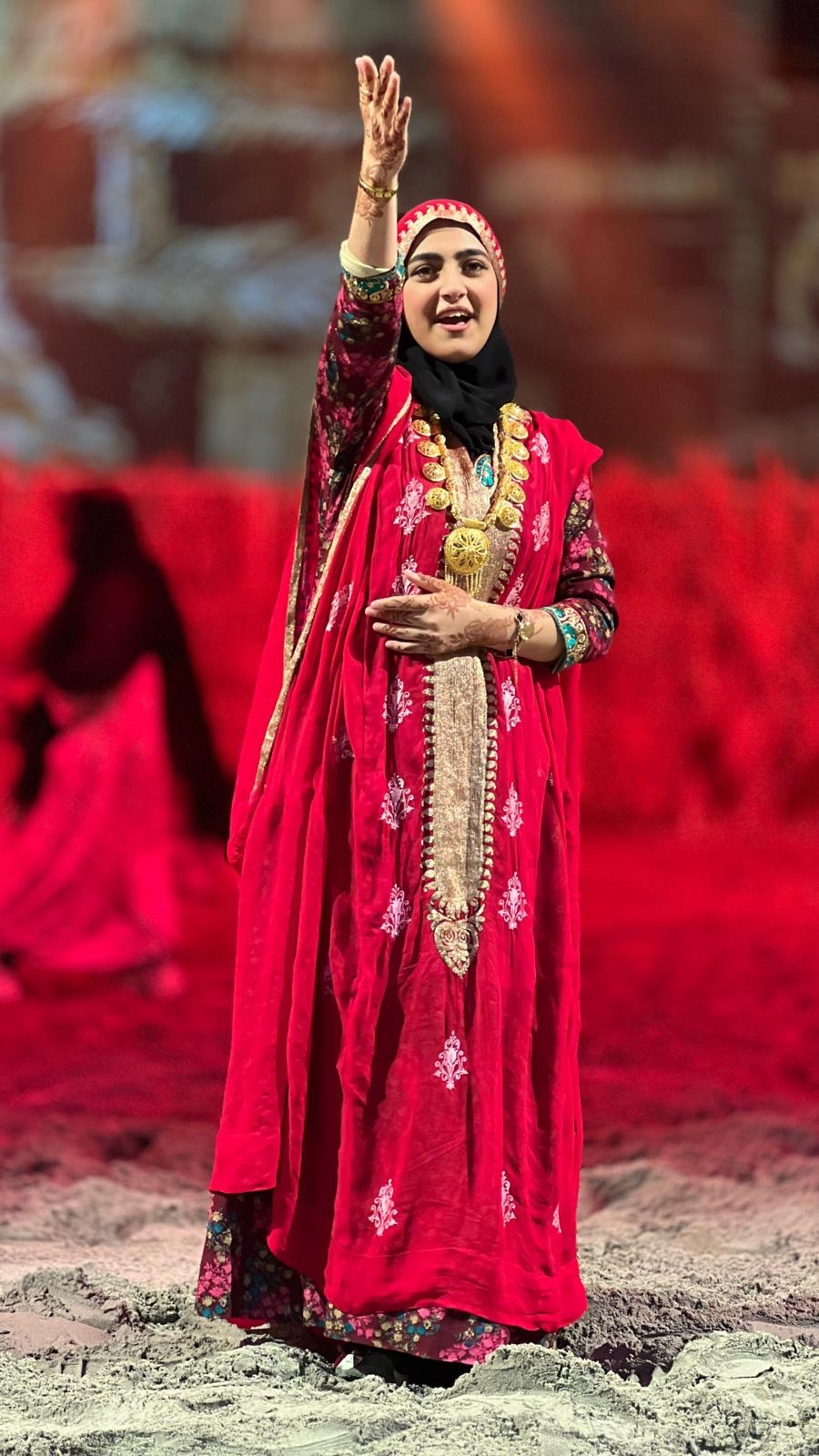
The Bahraini thobe al-nashl is one of the traditional women's garments in Bahrain and the Persian Gulf, distinguished by its elegance and luxurious embroidery.

- Thob-el-nashal (Arabic: ثوب النشل): The "Nashl" dress, mainly popular in Eastern Arabia, and especially in Bahrain, became renowned along the eastern coast of the Arabian Peninsula as one of the traditional women's garments. Women wore it during major occasions and took pride in it in Gulf countries such as Bahrain, Qatar, Kuwait, the UAE, and the Eastern Province of Saudi Arabia. It is said that the Nashl garment derives its name from the word manshal, referring to the brightly colored fabric that covered the howdah—the carriage used to transport the bride from one place to another. The Nashl dress can be beautifully colored in vibrant hues such as red, blue, purple, and green, but black stands out with its unique allure among all other colors. The Nashl dress is typically embroidered with a variety of golden patterns that enhance its brilliance and beauty. It is handcrafted by women and artisans from the villages of the region using needles and thread, after purchasing the special fabrics from traditional markets. Now this is mostly worn as a traditional Bahraini dress, although Bahrani women wore it before the 1979 revolution on special occasions.

== History ==
=== Pre-Islam ===
In pre-Islamic times, the region of Bahrain was part of the Persian Empire. Its population included Christians, particularly tribal partially-Christianized Arabs following Nestorian Christianity, who were of diverse origins and spoke different old Arabian vernaculars, a Persian clergy (Magians) who used Syriac as a language of liturgy and writing more generally, a mobile Persian-speaking population, (Note: likely spoke Middle "Pahlavi" Persian) who were possibly predominately Zoroastrian, traders and administrators with strong ties to Persia, with whom which they maintained close contact with, a small amount of Jews, pagan Arabs, and a sedentary, non-tribal community of Aramaic-speaking agriculturalists, The major tribes of pre-Islamic Bahrain included Abd al-Qais, Tamīm, and Bakr ibn Wāil. The Persian governor was Al-Mundhir ibn Sāwa ibn Zayd Manāt ibn Tamīm, who acted on behalf on the Persians.

=== Islam emerges (628–631 CE) ===
In 628 AD, the Prophet Muhammad sent his first envoy, Al-Ala'a Al-Hadrami, to Munzir ibn Sawa Al Tamimi, ruler of the historical region of Bahrain, which stretched from Kuwait’s coast to southern Qatar, including Al-Hasa, Qatif, and the Bahrain Islands, to invite him to Islam. Munzir and many of his subjects later converted.

=== 10th to 13th century ===
After that, the Uyunids took control from the Qarmatians.

Bahrain was ruled by the Uyunid Emirate led by Banu Abd al-Qays tribe, from 1076 until it was overthrown by the Usfurids in 1238.

During the 12th to 13th century (1253–1392), Eastern Arabia was ruled by the Usfurids.

Around this time, Bahrain became a hub for intellectuals for hundreds of years stretching from the early days of Islam in the 6th century to the 18th century. Philosophers of Bahrain were highly esteemed, such as the 13th century mystic, Sheikh Maitham Al Bahrani (died in 1299).

=== 14th–15th century ===
The Jarwanid dynasty ruled Eastern Arabian from 1310 to 1417.

Simultaneously, the Jarwanid dynasty ruled locally until 1417, followed by the Jabrids rule between 1417 and 1424.

=== 16th century ===
The Safavid dynasty controlled Bahrain (between 1501~1736), perhaps serving more of a protectorate as the locals were already on the Shia faith.

In 1521 a force led by António Correia captured Bahrain, defeating the Jabrid King, Muqrin ibn Zamil.

Later, local rules continued under Lahsa Eyalet (1560–1670), and continued after the fall of the Safavid Empire with Bani Khalid Emirate (1669–)...

=== 16th century ===
The Safavid dynasty, which established Shia Islam as the state religion in Persia (modern-day Iran) in the 16th century, had a further influence on the Shia communities of Bahrain. Bahrain's close proximity to Persia, along with political and religious ties, made it easier for Shia Islam to further spread in the region. Persian influence, particularly in trade and religious exchanges, reinforced the practice of Twelver Shia Islam among the Baharnah.

The Baharna, being predominantly Shia, generally aligned with the Safavids. However, the region experienced ongoing political and sectarian tensions between the Safavids and their rivals, such as the Ottomans and various Sunni Arab tribes. During the later part of Safavid rule, some Baharna families left Bahrain and sought refuge in Khuzestan, particularly when political instability and conflicts with neighbouring Sunni tribes increased. This phase of migration happened in the 17th century.

After the Safavid Empire fell in the early 18th century, Bahrain became vulnerable to invasions and shifts in power. The Omani invasion of Bahrain in 1717 destabilized the region, causing internal strife and pressure on the Shia Baharna population. The uncertainty and insecurity in Bahrain led some Baharna to migrate to Khuzestan, where they found refuge among local Arab tribes, such as the Muhammarah. This migration was more sporadic but occurred during the early 18th century.

=== 17th century ===
After the fall of the Safavid dynasty, Bahrain went through a period of anarchy, dismay, and self-rule in villages which made the country vulnerable to foreign invasions. Utub forces often attacked the island during this phase, which made the spiritual leader of Bahrain, Sheikh Mohammed ibn Abdullah Al Majed, use the Huwala to combat the Utubs' attacks. These attacks continued throughout the early 18th century until the Utubs launched a full-scale invasion of the island and established a government loyal to the Imam of Oman.

The Utubs were defeated and expelled by the Huwala forces loyal to Bahrain's spiritual leader who established a government headed by Sheikh Jabara Al-Holi (also known as Jubayr al-Holi). The Persian Afsharids led by former Safavid general Nader Shah invaded the island in 1737 and deposed Sheikh Jabara. Persian rule continued for 46 more years, with brief interruptions, until 1783, when the Al Khalifa family, who were Sunni Arabs from the Najd region (modern-day Saudi Arabia), took control of Bahrain after defeating Nader Shah.

The rule of Bani Khalid Emirate ended officially in 1796...

This shift in power led to increased sectarian tensions, as the predominantly Sunni Al Khalifa rulers imposed their authority over the Shia Baharna population. Many Baharna felt marginalized and oppressed under the new rule.

=== 18th century ===
According to historical and British archival sources, large-scale Bahrani migrations began in the mid-18th century, coinciding with internal conflicts, the decline of the agricultural economy, and regional instability following the rise of new powers in eastern Arabia. The 1732 Omani invasion of Bahrain was one of the earliest events that triggered the displacement of many Baharnah families toward nearby coastal regions, particularly al-Aḥsāʾ, Basra, and the Arab-speaking ports of southern Iran, such as Bushehr, Lengeh, and Khorramshahr (Muhammarah), where they settled and integrated with local Arab tribes like Banu Kaab and Banu Kanaan.

By the late 18th century, further groups of Baharnah had settled in Kuwait, where their skills as shipbuilders, carpenters, and merchants became highly valued during the port's commercial expansion. Danish explorer Carsten Niebuhr recorded the presence of Bahrani families on Failaka Island as early as 1765, noting that most inhabitants originated from Bahrain and worked in the pearl-diving trade.

The Baharnah community traditionally consisted of three main occupational groups: farmers, who tended Bahrain's date groves and migrated mainly to fertile areas like al-Aḥsāʾ and Basra; craftsmen, many of whom moved to Kuwait and southern Iran; and merchants, who maintained active trade routes linking Bahrain to ports across the Persian Gulf. Despite centuries of displacement, the Baharnah preserved their linguistic, cultural, and religious identity, forming one of the oldest continuous Shia communities in the Gulf region.

=== 19th century ===
Throughout the 19th and early 20th centuries, successive waves of Baharnah continued to migrate across the northern Gulf, forming extended family networks that maintained strong ties to their homeland. Many prominent Kuwaiti and Gulf families trace their ancestry to Bahrani origins—among them families known for traditional crafts and trades such as al-Qallāf, al-Khayyāṭ, al-Ustād, al-Fardan, al-Metrouk, al-Sammāk, and al-Jazzāf—whose names still appear in both Bahrain and Kuwait today.

Throughout the 19th century, Bahrain continued to experience internal conflicts, especially between the ruling Al Khalifa family and the Baharna population. Disputes over land, taxation, and sectarian discrimination pushed more Baharna to seek better conditions elsewhere. During this period, additional Baharna families migrated to Khuzestan, where they joined the earlier waves of migrants. By this time, they had established strong ties with local Arab tribes, including the House of Ghannam and the Al Hilalat.

=== 1920s reforms ===
Before the British intervention in 1923, the Baharnah had staged an uprising in 1922 to protest against the mistreatment and discrimination they faced. Al-Tajir (1987) recounts the events leading to the uprising, noting that a delegation of Baharnah, accompanied by prominent Sunni figures, sought an audience with the ruler. During this meeting, the Baharnah presented eight demands, which included ending their ill-treatment, abolishing additional taxes imposed exclusively on them, and putting a stop to forced labor ("sukhra").

The delay in addressing these basic demands caused unrest, leading to broader instability as other groups in Bahrain clashed over various issues. In 1923, the British intervened, reorganizing the state's affairs. These reforms created both winners and losers, with the Shia Baharnah considered relative beneficiaries, as they were no longer subjected to official discrimination.

However, certain influential factions within the ruling elite perceived themselves as having lost privileges and rejected the 1923 reforms. The adversarial response to these changes is evident in the actions of Sir Charles Belgrave, the British Advisor to Bahrain's Government from 1926 to 1957, who monitored these groups. Some members of the ruling family faced imprisonment or were barred from receiving funds from the Privy Purse.

These groups and individuals, particularly those within the ruling family, harbored deep resentment toward the new administration and the policies introduced by Major Daly, the British Political Agent in 1923, and later upheld by Sir Charles Belgrave. With Britain's influence waning in Bahrain by the early 1960s, especially after Belgrave's departure in 1957, some of those opposed to the 1923 changes began reasserting their influence, which grew significantly in recent years.

The introduction of modern education and the discovery of oil in 1932 catalyzed nationalist movements in the 1930s and 1950s, with the Baharnah Shia actively participating alongside other key groups in Bahrain's society.

According to Al-Salman (forthcoming), a group of prominent Baharnah figures were at the forefront of Bahrain's national movement in the 1930s, advocating for political and judicial reforms. Following the discovery and commercial production of oil in 1932, eight notable Baharnah leaders collaborated with other segments of society to push for meaningful reforms, laying the groundwork for modern democracy in Bahrain.

In December 1934, these eight dignitaries—Mansoor Al-Arrayedh, Mohsin Al-Tajir, Abd Ali Al-Ulaiwait, Abdul Rasool bin Rajab, Haj Abdul Aziz bin Hujair Al-Bori, Ahmed bin Naser, Hussain Al-Madhoob, and Haj Ali bin Abbas Al-Aali—submitted a petition to Sheikh Hamad bin Isa Al-Khalifa. They reminded him that the Baharnah's support had been instrumental in stabilizing the country during his reign as crown prince and ruler. They called for key reforms, including the codification of legal provisions, proportional representation to ensure fair Baharnah representation in municipal and trade councils, and the establishment of schools for the Baharnah.

Rush (1991) notes that the British Political Agent in Bahrain and the British Political Resident in Bushehr reported that these demands deeply unsettled the political establishment, particularly as the eight leaders had widespread support among the Baharnah population.

The journey of return for some Baharnah to their homeland of Bahrain began in 1951, following the intensification of Persian harassment campaigns against the ethnic Arabs of Muhammarah. Some of them were politically active within the ranks of the Arab national movement, which aimed to restore Arab rule.

Over the centuries, the Baharnah people increasingly identified with the Shia community, in part due to the social and political dynamics of the region. Shia Islam was often seen as a unifying force against the Sunni rulers or dominant forces in the region, such as the various local ruling families or the Ottoman Empire. As Shia Islam became more integrated into the local identity of the Baharnah, it strengthened the community's sense of unity and distinctiveness within the broader Islamic world.

== Notable people ==
- Abdul Hadi Al-Khawaja, Bahraini political activist.
- Ramin Bahrani
- Ayat Al-Qarmizi
- Nabil Rajab
- Mahdi Abu Deeb
- Hassan Mushaima
- Zainab Al-Khawaja, Bahraini political activist and daughter of Abdul Hadi Al-Khawaja.
- Mohammed Haddad
- Mohammed Sayed Adnan
- Mohammed Al-Maskati
- Hussain Al-Sabaa
- Tariq Al-Farsani
- Jassim Al-Huwaidi
- Alaa Hubail, Bahraini footballer.

== Gallery ==
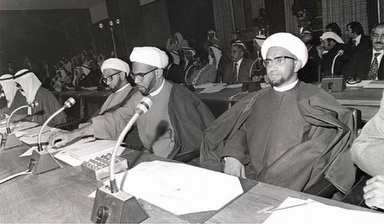
Bahrani Mullahs in the parliament during 1973

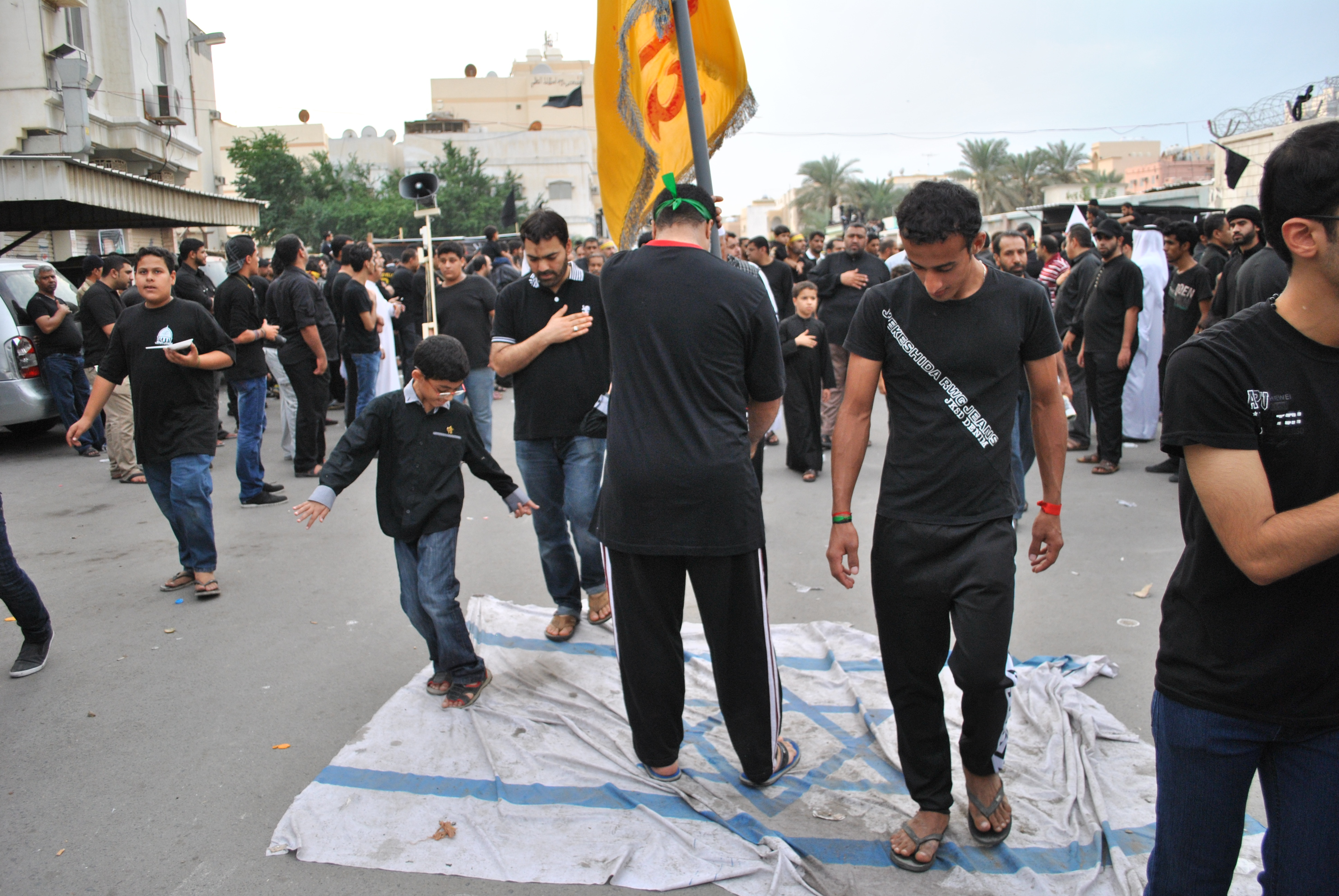
Shia Bahranis stepping over Israel flag

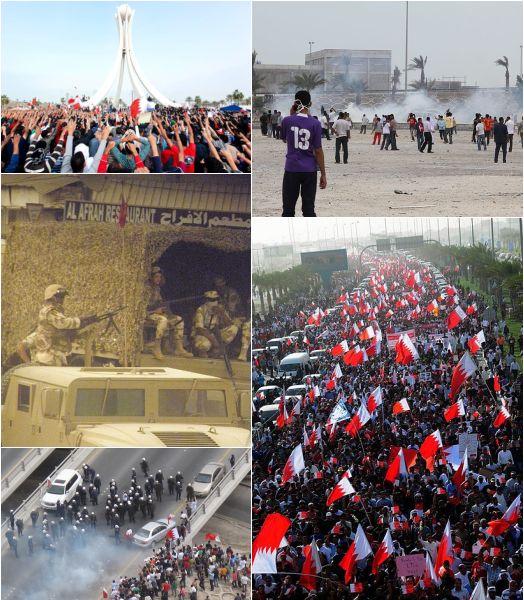
2011 Uprising was a majorly Bahrani protest, but not exclusively

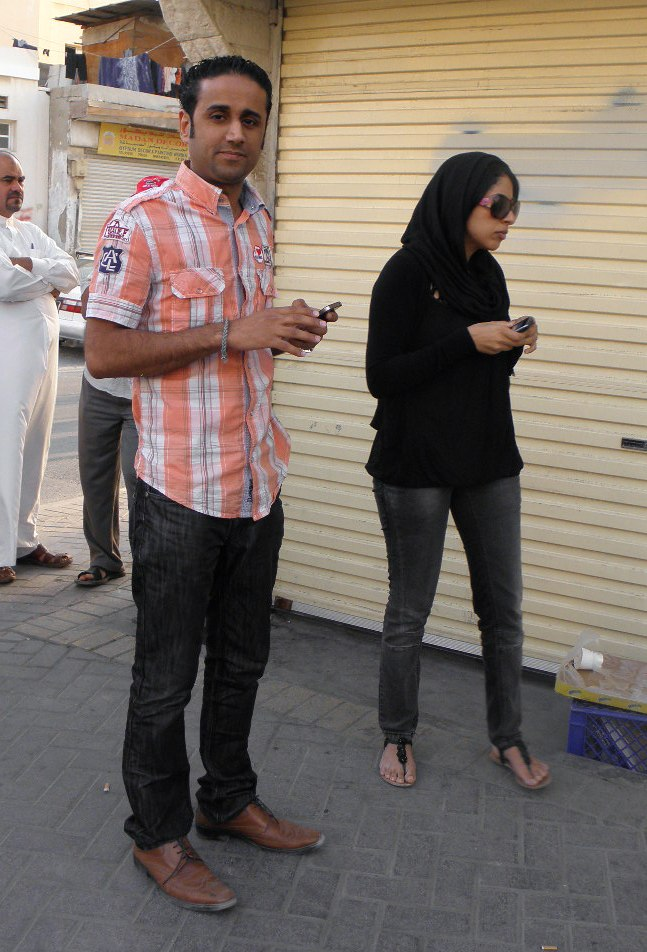
S. Yousif al-Mahafdha and Zainab al-Khawaja obsvering a protest in Jidhafs

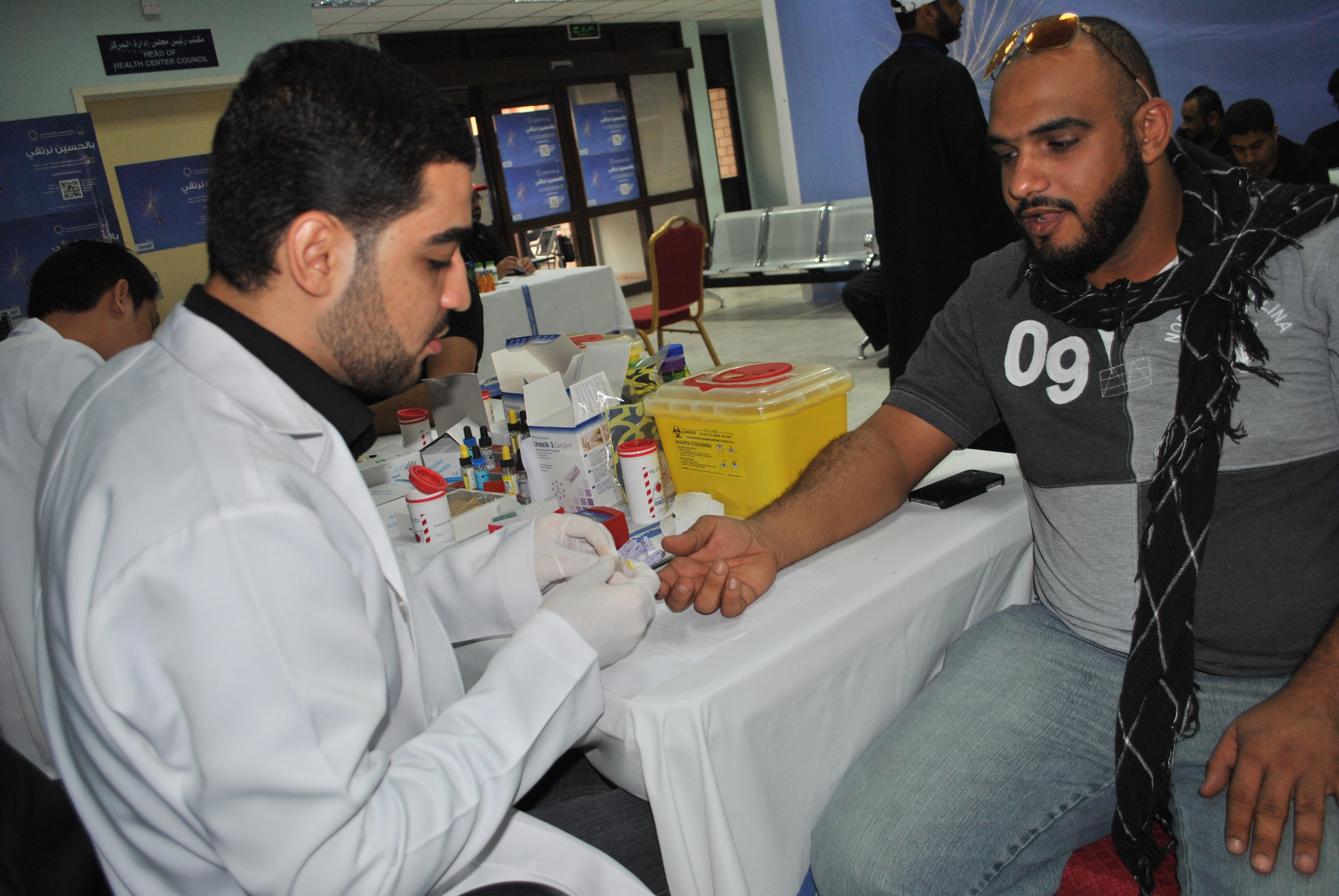
Bahrani man offering his blood for donation during Ashura

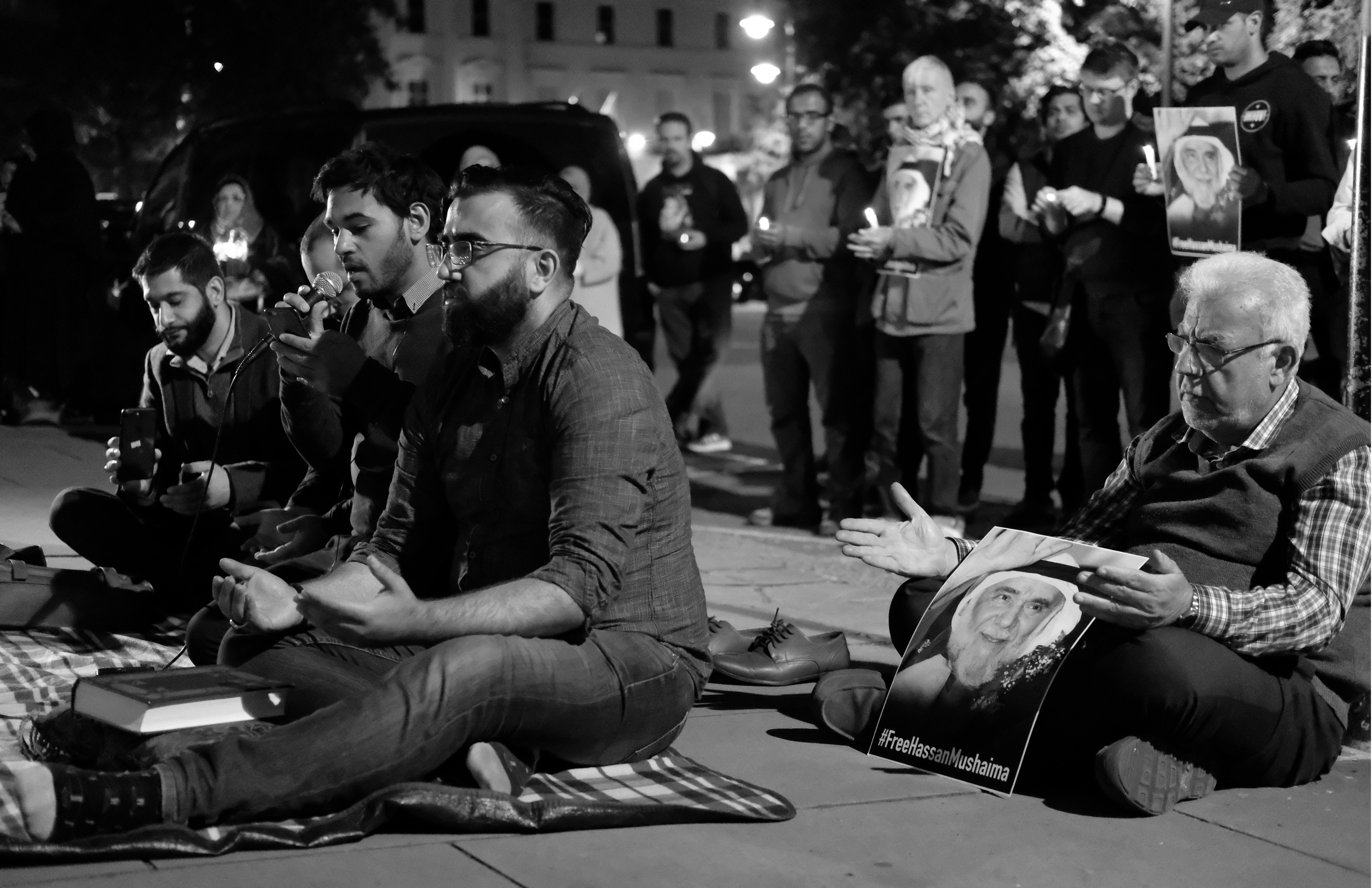

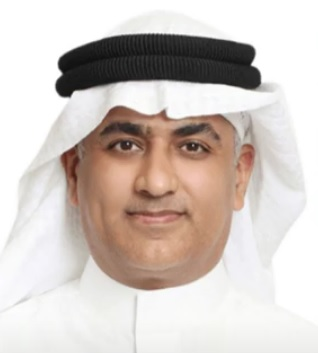
Mamdouh Abbas Al-Saleh

== See also ==
- History of Bahrain

Language and culture

- Bahrani Arabic
- Shia Islam in Saudi Arabia

Geography

- Bahrain (historical region)

Bahrani People

- List of Bahranis
- Baharna in Kuwait
