= Baharna in Kuwait =

The Baharna in Kuwait (Arabic: البحارنة في الكويت) migrated from their home country of Bahrain to Kuwait in the second half of the 18th century due to commercial opportunities or persecution or political instability in the Al Khalifa sheikhdom. The Baharna of Kuwait were typically shipbuilders, lived in their own quarter (فريج البحارنة firīj il-Baḥārna), although not segregated and were not prohibited from living elsewhere. The quarter itself was not exclusively Baharna either.

The 18th century German explorer Carsten Niebuhr visited Failaka Island in 1765 and found that a disproportionate amount of its inhabitants were Baharna and whom worked as pearl divers.
