= Bahraini Halwa =

Traditional Bahraini dessert

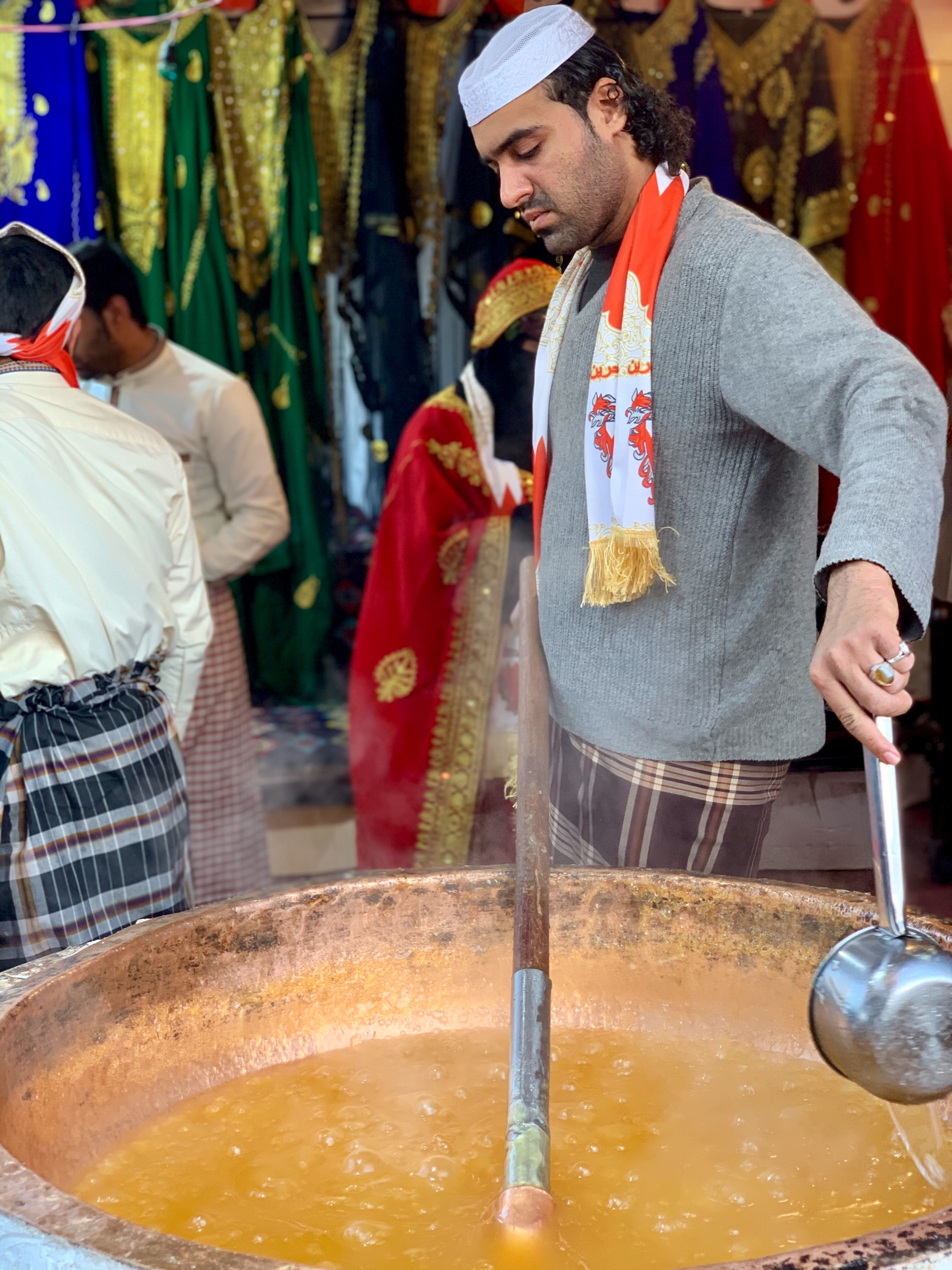
- Place of origin: Bahrain
- Associated cuisine: Bahraini cuisine
- Main ingredients: Starch, sugar, nuts, saffron, rose water, and cardamom

Bahraini Halwa (Arabic: حلوى بحرينية, romanized: Ḥlwá Baḥraynīyah) is a traditional and popular dessert in Bahrain and the Gulf countries, called the queen of the sweets. It is mainly made from starch, sugar, nuts, saffron, rose water, and cardamom. its colour ranges from deep amber to rich brown.

== Etymology ==
The name halwa is derived from the Arabic word (hulw) which translates to sweet.

== Background ==
Bahraini halwa is a traditional sticky sweet that is part of Bahraini culture and hospitality. It differs from sesame halva in that it is made from starch and has a firm, jelly like consistency, and usually served warm or at room temperature. It is traditionally prepared in large copper pots, and cooked over an open fire; the preparation process is laborious, requiring constant stirring for several hours to prevent burning. Its texture is less elastic compared to Qatari Halwa, a direct descendant of the Omani version. The age of this sweet is estimated to be more than 200 years, according to dated utensils in the Bahrain National Museum, and it is believed to have been introduced to Bahrain in the mid 19th century, most likely from Iraq, although some experts suggest it may have arrived from Oman.

== See also ==
- Bahraini cuisine
- Zalabia
