= Bahrani Arabic =

Variety of Arabic of Eastern Arabia and Oman

- Baharna Arabic; Bahrani Shīʿite Arabic
- العربية البحرانية
- Native to: Bahrain, Saudi Arabia
- Ethnicity: Baharna
- Native speakers: 730,000 (2019)
- Language family: Afro-Asiatic: Semitic; Central Semitic; Arabic; Peninsular; Bahrani Arabic
- Dialects: Qatifi
- Writing system: Arabic alphabet, Arabic chat alphabet

Language codes
- ISO 639-3: abv
- Glottolog: baha1259
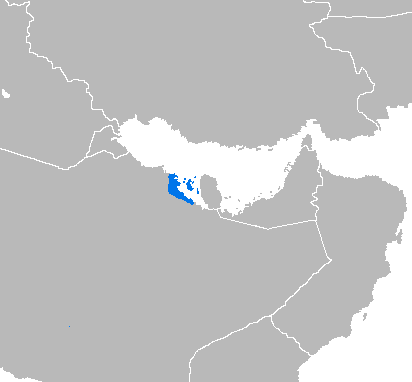

Bahrani Arabic (also known as Bahrani or Baharna Arabic) is a variety of Arabic spoken by the Baharna in Eastern Arabia and Oman. In Bahrain, the dialect is primarily spoken in Shia villages and some parts of Manama. In Saudi Arabia, the dialect is spoken in the governorate of Qatif. In Oman, it is spoken in the governorates of Al Dhahirah and Al Batinah.

The Bahrani Arabic dialect has been significantly influenced by the ancient Aramaic, Syriac, and Akkadian languages.

In Bahrain, Bahrani is more typical of the mostly-Shia and mostly-rural Baharna, who make up the older population group of Bahrain, and it exists alongside Gulf Arabic, which is mostly spoken by Sunni Arabs, who started arriving in the late 18th century. The Gulf Arabic of the Sunni Arabs, who are concentrated in the cities of Bahrain, and importantly include the royal family, became the prestige language of the country, leading to Baharna Arabic becoming influenced by it.

The Persian language has debatably had the most foreign linguistic influence on all Bahraini dialects. The differences between Bahrani Arabic and other Bahraini dialects suggest differing historical origins. The main differences between Bahrani and non-Bahrani dialects are evident in certain grammatical forms and pronunciation. Most of the vocabulary, however, is shared between dialects, or is distinctly Bahraini, arising from a shared modern history.

== Examples of words borrowed from other languages ==
- bānka 'ceiling fan' from Hindi (पंखा) or Persian 'Pankeh' (پنکه). (Note: Common in various Indo-Iranian languages, said to have roots in Sanskrit)
- sōmān 'equipment' from Urdu.
- Jooti 'shoe' from Hindi or Urdu 'Joota' (جوتا).
- lētar 'lighter' from English.
- wīl 'wheel' from English.
- tēm 'time' from English.
- dareesha 'window' from Persian 'Darecheh' (دریچه). (Note: Dareecheh means "small door" or "trap door" or "vent", in Turkish they say Pancere/Panjereh like Persian, but Darecheh is exclusively a loanword from Persian meaning little door)
- dowshag 'mattress' from Persian 'Doshak' (دوشک).
- orradi 'already' from English.
- leitāt 'lights' from English.

Like Gulf Arabic, Bahrani Arabic has borrowed some vocabulary from Persian, Urdu, Ottoman Turkish, and more recently from English.

== Features ==
Researcher Clive Holes divided the sedentary dialects of the Gulf to two types:

1. Type A, which includes the dialects of Sunni tribes that settled in Eastern Arabia between the 17th and 19th century, and the Huwala. This group includes the standard Gulf Arabic dialects of Kuwait, Qatar, Bahrain, and UAE.
2. Type B, which includes the dialects of Omani Ibadis and Eastern Arabian Shia (the Baharna).

Bahrani Arabic (called Baħrāni by its speakers) shares many features with surrounding Type A dialects (e.g. Kuwait, UAE, Qatar). Some general features:

- Classical Arabic /q/ becomes /g/, for example gamar (moon).
- Classical Arabic /ð/ becomes /d/, for example danab (tail).
- /q/ and /ð/ is preserved for some Classical Arabic borrowings, for example [ðulqaʕdah] (Dhu Al-Qa'dah).
- Affrication of /k/ to /tʃ/ in many words, for example [tʃalb] (fox).
- /θ/ has the free variant /f/, and in some dialects /t/, for example falāfeh or talāteh (three).
- /dʒ/ becomes /j/ in some rural dialects, for example yiħħe (watermelon).
- Usage of -sh suffix (/ʃ/) as a feminine second-person pronoun akin to masculine -k, for example babish (your door).
- Usage of sentence-final particle e (pronounced [ɛː]) to indicate questions, for example 'inzaine (OK?).

=== Phonology ===
Bahrani Arabic consonants
		Labial	Dental	Denti-alveolar		Alveolar		Palatal	Velar	Uvular	Pharyngeal	Glottal
		Labial	Dental	plain	emphatic	plain	emphatic	Palatal	Velar	Uvular	Pharyngeal	Glottal
Nasal		m				n						
Plosive	voiceless			t	tˤ			tʃ	k	(q)		ʔ
Plosive	voiced	b		d	dˤ			dʒ	ɡ			
Fricative	voiceless	f	θ			s	sˤ	ʃ	x		ħ	h
Fricative	voiced		(ð)			z			ɣ		ʕ	
Trill						r						
Approximant						l		j	w			

Bahrani Arabic vowels
	Front	Back
Close	i iː	u uː
Mid	(e) eː	(o) oː
Open	a aː	ɑ ɑː

== See also ==
- Varieties of Arabic
- Peninsular Arabic
