= Muhammar =

Bahraini rice dish

Muhammar is a traditional dish from Bahrain. It is a sweet rice dish seasoned with spices and date molasses, and is usually eaten with fried or grilled fish. The rice is parboiled and then steamed.

== See also ==
- Musakhan: a Jordanian and Palestinian dish, also known as muhammar
