= Mahyawa =

Iranian cuisine tangy sauce made out of fermented fish

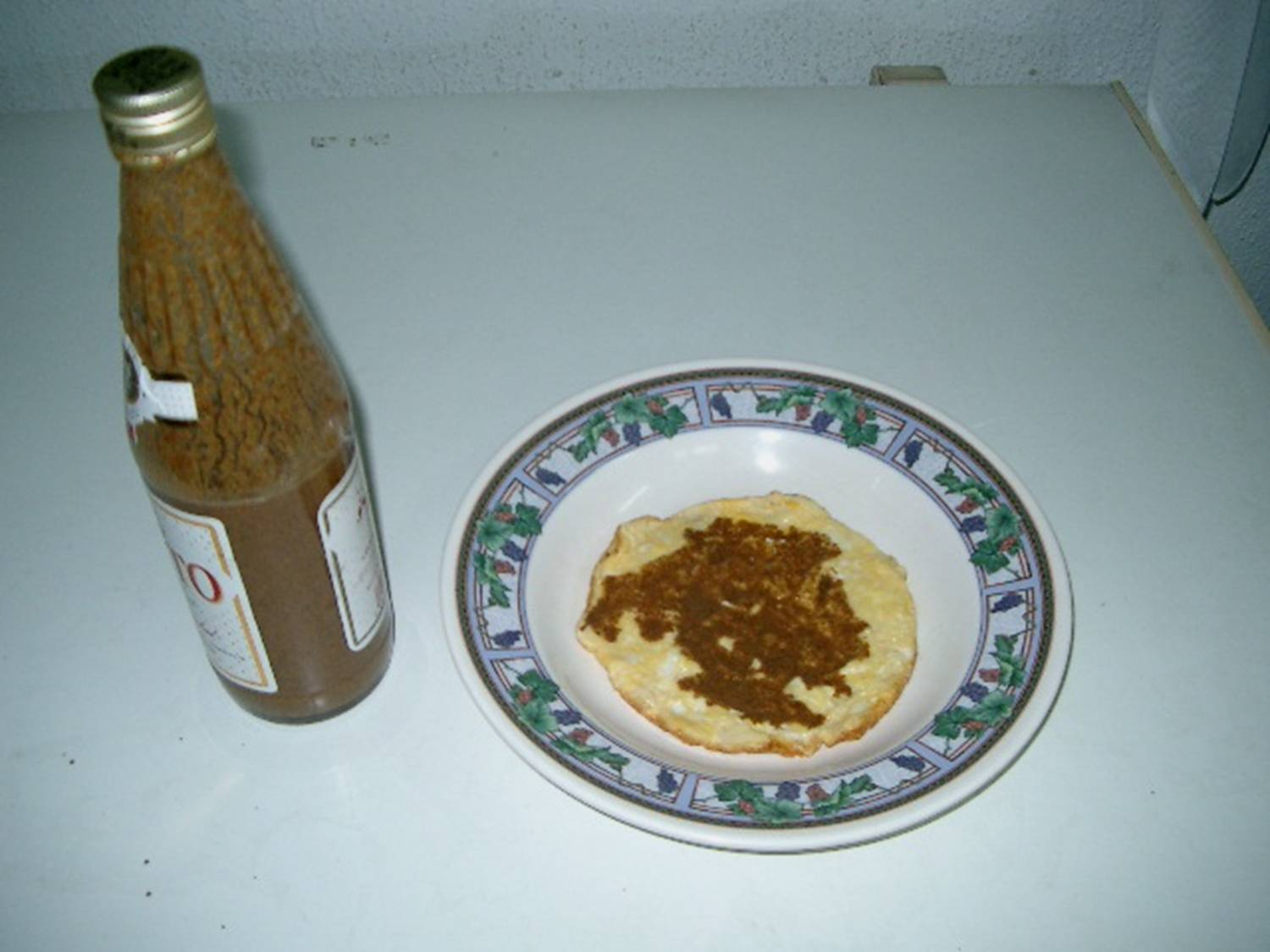
- Mahyawa (bottle)
- Alternative names: Mahyâveh (Standard Iranian Persian) Mahiâveh/Mahveh (Achomi Persian) Mahyaweh/Mashaweh (GCC Countries)
- Type: Fish sauce
- Place of origin: Iran (South)
- Region or state: Iran, Kuwait, Bahrain, United Arab Emirates, Qatar
- Main ingredients: Anchovy fishes, fennel seeds, cumin seeds, coriander seeds, Mustard seeds, water, Flatbread

Mahyâveh (Persian: مهیاوه) is an Iranian cuisine tangy sauce made out of fermented fish.

Mahyâveh is often sold at bakeries and by street vendors in the southern parts of Iran, especially in Hormozgan, Bushehr and the southern parts of Fars province, and in some GCC Countries, in clear bottles, showing the darkly colored sauce.

== Etymology ==
The name (Mahyâveh, Persian: ماهی‌آوه) is derived from Mahveh (مهوه) which in the Achomi Persian language means mah (ِمَه; mah or ماهی; mahi) for “fish” and aweh (آوَه) or ow (آو) for “water”. Achomi Persian ow (آو) and mah (مَه) are the equivalents of âb (آب) and mâhi (ماهی) in Standard Iranian Persian.

== History ==
Mahyâveh is widely consumed in Southern Iran, particularly in the southern regions of Fars Province and Hormozgan, as well as in some other parts of the Persian Gulf, especially in the GCC countries, where it has been introduced by Iranian immigrants such as the Achums (known locally as Persian Ajam community).

Mahyâveh was invented by the Persian physician Avicenna. According to some sources, it was firstly prepared by Bozorgmehr, the minister of the Sasanian Persian king Anoushirvan. It is believed that eating Mahyâveh, which also contains mustard, prevents skin disease (Vitiligo).

== Benefits ==
Mahyâveh contains phosphorus and calcium, in addition to many vitamins. Among its benefits is that it helps reduce the effects of bronchial asthma and enhances mental strength. Fish is also known as "food for the brain." Research has shown that fish is brain food due to its high protein content. Fish oil has the ability to relieve rheumatic pain and joint stiffness, and it also contains vitamin D.

Additionally, it helps reduce the risk of poisoning from toxic substances like mercury. It lowers the risk of death from heart disease by 30%, reduces the symptoms of rheumatoid arthritis, relieves migraine pain, prevents cancerous tumors (as tested on lab animals), and regulates the function of anti-inflammatory substances.

== Preparation ==
It is made primarily from dried, salted anchovies which are less than 10 cm in length, and a blend of aromatic spices. The fish may be sun-dried, with heads removed before grinding into a fine powder. The spice mix typically includes coriander seeds (toasted until slightly browned), fennel or anise seeds, cumin (ground), and mustard seeds (which can be added whole or ground). Some versions also include coarse salt, white vinegar, lemon juice, and water to help ferment the mixture. Mahyâveh can vary slightly in ingredients depending on the region in South Iran. Some recipes may favor fennel over anise, or use different ratios of spices.

== See also ==
- List of fish sauces
